Joseph Vissarionovich Stalin (born Ioseb Besarionis dze Jughashvili;  – 5 March 1953) was a revolutionary in the Russian Empire and political leader who led the Soviet Union from 1924 until his death in 1953. He held power as General Secretary of the Communist Party of the Soviet Union (1922–1952) and Chairman of the Council of Ministers of the Soviet Union (1941–1953). Initially governing the country as part of a collective leadership, he consolidated power to become a dictator by 1928. Ideologically adhering to the Leninist interpretation of Marxism, he formalised these ideas as Marxism–Leninism, while his own policies are called Stalinism.

Born to a poor ethnic Georgian family in the town of Gori in the Tiflis Governorate of the Russian Empire (now part of Georgia), Stalin joined the Marxist Russian Social Democratic Labour Party in 1901. He edited the party's newspaper, Pravda, and raised funds for Vladimir Lenin's Bolshevik faction via robberies, kidnappings and protection rackets. Repeatedly arrested, he underwent several internal exiles to Siberia. After the Bolsheviks seized power in the October Revolution and created a one-party state under the new Communist Party in 1917, Stalin joined its governing Politburo. Serving in the Russian Civil War before overseeing the Soviet Union's establishment in 1922, Stalin assumed leadership over the country following Lenin's death in 1924. Under Stalin, socialism in one country became a central tenet of the party's ideology. As a result of his Five-Year Plans, the country underwent agricultural collectivisation and rapid industrialisation, creating a centralised command economy. Severe disruptions to food production contributed to the famine of 1930–33 that killed millions. To eradicate accused "enemies of the working class", Stalin instituted the Great Purge, in which over a million were imprisoned, largely in the Gulag system of forced labour camps, and at least 700,000 executed between 1936 and 1938.

Stalin promoted Marxism–Leninism abroad through the Communist International and supported European anti-fascist movements during the 1930s, particularly in the Spanish Civil War. In 1939, his regime signed a non-aggression pact with Nazi Germany, resulting in the Soviet invasion of Poland. Germany ended the pact by invading the Soviet Union in 1941, after which Stalin joined the Allies of World War II as one of the Big Three. Despite initial catastrophes, the Soviet Red Army repelled the German invasion and captured Berlin in 1945, ending World War II in Europe. Amid the war, the Soviets annexed the Baltic states and Bessarabia and North Bukovina, subsequently establishing Soviet-aligned governments throughout Central and Eastern Europe and in parts of East Asia. The Soviet Union and the United States emerged as global superpowers and entered a period of tension, the Cold War. Stalin presided over the Soviet post-war reconstruction and its development of an atomic bomb in 1949. During these years, the country experienced another major famine and an antisemitic campaign that culminated in the doctors' plot. After Stalin's death in 1953, he was eventually succeeded by Nikita Khrushchev, who subsequently denounced his rule and initiated the de-Stalinisation of Soviet society.

Widely considered to be one of the 20th century's most significant figures, Stalin was the subject of a pervasive personality cult within the international Marxist–Leninist movement, which revered him as a champion of the working class and socialism. Since the dissolution of the Soviet Union in 1991, Stalin has retained popularity in Russia and Georgia as a victorious wartime leader who cemented the Soviet Union's status as a leading world power. Conversely, his regime has been described as totalitarian, and has been widely condemned for overseeing mass repression, ethnic cleansing, wide-scale deportation, hundreds of thousands of executions, and famines that killed millions.

Early life

1878–1899: Childhood to young adulthood 

Stalin was born in Georgia in the town of Gori, then part of the Tiflis Governorate of the Russian Empire and home to a mix of Georgians, Azerbaijanis, Armenians, Russians, and Jews. His birth name was Ioseb Besarionis dze Jughashvili, and he was nicknamed "Soso", a diminutive of "Ioseb". His parents were Besarion Jughashvili and Ekaterine Geladze. He was their only child to survive past infancy.

Besarion was a cobbler who was employed in a workshop owned by another man; it was initially a financial success but later fell into decline, and the family found itself living in poverty. Besarion became an alcoholic and drunkenly beat his wife and son. Ekaterine and Stalin left the home by 1883 and began a wandering life, moving through nine different rented rooms over the next decade. In 1886, they moved into the house of a family friend, Father Christopher Charkviani. Ekaterine worked as a house cleaner and launderer and was determined to send her son to school. In September 1888, Stalin enrolled at the Orthodox Gori Church School, a place secured by Charkviani. Although he got into many fights, Stalin excelled academically, displaying talent in painting and drama classes, writing his own poetry, and singing as a choirboy. Stalin faced several severe health problems: An 1884 smallpox infection left him with facial scars; and at age 12 he was seriously injured when he was hit by a phaeton, probably the cause of a lifelong disability in his left arm.

In August 1894, Stalin enrolled in the Orthodox Spiritual Seminary in Tiflis, enabled by a scholarship that allowed him to study at a reduced rate. He joined 600 trainee priests who boarded there, and he achieved high grades. He continued writing poetry; five of his poems, on themes such as nature, land and patriotism, were published under the pseudonym of "Soselo" in Ilia Chavchavadze's newspaper Iveria (Georgia). According to Stalin's biographer Simon Sebag Montefiore, they became "minor Georgian classics" and were included in various anthologies of Georgian poetry over the coming years. As he grew older, Stalin lost interest in priestly studies, his grades dropped, and he was repeatedly confined to a cell for his rebellious behaviour. The seminary's journal noted that he declared himself an atheist, stalked out of prayers and refused to doff his hat to monks.

Stalin joined a forbidden book club at the school; he was particularly influenced by Nikolay Chernyshevsky's 1863 pro-revolutionary novel What Is To Be Done? Another influential text was Alexander Kazbegi's The Patricide, with Stalin adopting the nickname "Koba" from that of the book's bandit protagonist. The pseudonym may also have been a tribute to his wealthy benefactor, Yakobi "Koba" Egnatashvili, who paid for his schooling at the Tiflis seminary. ("Koba" is the Georgian diminutive of Yakobi, or Jacob, and Stalin later named his first-born son in Egnatashvili's honour.) He also read Das Kapital, the 1867 book by German sociological theorist Karl Marx. Stalin devoted himself to Marx's socio-political theory, Marxism, which was then on the rise in Georgia, one of various forms of socialism opposed to the empire's governing tsarist authorities. At night, he attended secret workers' meetings and was introduced to Silibistro "Silva" Jibladze, the Marxist founder of Mesame Dasi ("Third Group"), a Georgian socialist group. Stalin left the seminary in April 1899 and never returned.

1899–1904: Russian Social-Democratic Labour Party 

In October 1899, Stalin began work as a meteorologist at the Tiflis observatory. He had a light workload and therefore had plenty of time for revolutionary activity. He attracted a group of supporters through his classes in socialist theory and co-organised a secret workers' mass meeting for May Day 1900, at which he successfully encouraged many of the men to take strike action. By this point, the empire's secret police, the Okhrana, were aware of Stalin's activities in Tiflis' revolutionary milieu. They attempted to arrest him in March 1901, but he escaped and went into hiding, living off the donations of friends and sympathisers. Remaining underground, he helped plan a demonstration for May Day 1901, in which 3,000 marchers clashed with the authorities. He continued to evade arrest by using aliases and sleeping in different apartments. In November 1901, he was elected to the Tiflis Committee of the Russian Social Democratic Labour Party (RSDLP), a Marxist party founded in 1898.

That month, Stalin travelled to the port city of Batum. His militant rhetoric proved divisive among the city's Marxists, some of whom suspected that he might be an agent provocateur working for the government. He found employment at the Rothschild refinery storehouse, where he co-organised two workers' strikes. After several strike leaders were arrested, he co-organised a mass public demonstration which led to the storming of the prison; troops fired upon the demonstrators, 13 of whom were killed. Stalin organised another mass demonstration on the day of their funeral, before being arrested in April 1902. Held first in Batumi Prison and then Kutaisi Prison, in mid-1903 he was sentenced to three years of exile in eastern Siberia.

Stalin left Batum in October, arriving at the small Siberian town of Novaya Uda in late November 1903. There, he lived in a two-room peasant's house, sleeping in the building's larder. He made two escape attempts: On the first, he made it to Balagansk before returning due to frostbite. His second attempt, in January 1904, was successful and he made it to Tiflis. There, he co-edited a Georgian Marxist newspaper, Proletariatis Brdzola ("Proletarian Struggle"), with Philip Makharadze. He called for the Georgian Marxist movement to split from its Russian counterpart, resulting in several RSDLP members accusing him of holding views contrary to the ethos of Marxist internationalism and calling for his expulsion from the party; he soon recanted his opinions. During his exile, the RSDLP had split between Vladimir Lenin's "Bolsheviks" and Julius Martov's "Mensheviks". Stalin detested many of the Mensheviks in Georgia and aligned himself with the Bolsheviks. Although he established a Bolshevik stronghold in the mining town of Chiatura, Bolshevism remained a minority force in the Menshevik-dominated Georgian revolutionary scene.

1905–1912: Revolution of 1905 and its aftermath 

In January 1905, government troops massacred protesters in Saint Petersburg. Unrest soon spread across the Russian Empire in what came to be known as the Revolution of 1905. Georgia was particularly affected. Stalin was in Baku in February when ethnic violence broke out between Armenians and Azeris; at least 2,000 were killed. He publicly lambasted the "pogroms against Jews and Armenians" as being part of Tsar Nicholas II's attempts to "buttress his despicable throne". Stalin formed a Bolshevik Battle Squad which he used to try to keep Baku's warring ethnic factions apart; he also used the unrest as a cover for stealing printing equipment. Amid the growing violence throughout Georgia he formed further Battle Squads, with the Mensheviks doing the same. Stalin's squads disarmed local police and troops, raided government arsenals, and raised funds through protection rackets on large local businesses and mines. They launched attacks on the government's Cossack troops and pro-Tsarist Black Hundreds, co-ordinating some of their operations with the Menshevik militia.

In November 1905, the Georgian Bolsheviks elected Stalin as one of their delegates to a Bolshevik conference in Saint Petersburg. On arrival, he met Lenin's wife Nadezhda Krupskaya, who informed him that the venue had been moved to Tampere in the Grand Duchy of Finland. At the conference Stalin met Lenin for the first time. Although Stalin held Lenin in deep respect, he was vocal in his disagreement with Lenin's view that the Bolsheviks should field candidates for the forthcoming election to the State Duma; Stalin saw the parliamentary process as a waste of time. In April 1906, Stalin attended the RSDLP Fourth Congress in Stockholm; this was his first trip outside the Russian Empire. At the conference, the RSDLP — then led by its Menshevik majority — agreed that it would not raise funds using armed robbery. Lenin and Stalin disagreed with this decision and later privately discussed how they could continue the robberies for the Bolshevik cause.

Stalin married Kato Svanidze in an Orthodox church ceremony at Senaki in July 1906. In March 1907 she bore a son, Yakov. By that year — according to the historian Robert Service — Stalin had established himself as "Georgia's leading Bolshevik". He attended the Fifth RSDLP Congress, held at the Brotherhood Church in London in May–June 1907. After returning to Tiflis, Stalin organised the robbing of a large delivery of money to the Imperial Bank in June 1907. His gang ambushed the armed convoy in Erivan Square with gunfire and home-made bombs. Around 40 people were killed, but all of his gang escaped alive. After the heist, Stalin settled in Baku with his wife and son. There, Mensheviks confronted Stalin about the robbery and voted to expel him from the RSDLP, but he took no notice of them.

In Baku, Stalin secured Bolshevik domination of the local RSDLP branch and edited two Bolshevik newspapers, Bakinsky Proletary and Gudok ("Whistle"). In August 1907, he attended the Seventh Congress of the Second International — an international socialist organisation — in Stuttgart, Germany. In November 1907, his wife died of typhus, and he left his son with her family in Tiflis. In Baku he had reassembled his gang, the Outfit, which continued to attack Black Hundreds and raised finances by running protection rackets, counterfeiting currency, and carrying out robberies. They also kidnapped the children of several wealthy figures to extract ransom money. In early 1908, he travelled to the Swiss city of Geneva to meet with Lenin and the prominent Russian Marxist Georgi Plekhanov, although the latter exasperated him.

In March 1908, Stalin was arrested and interned in Bailov Prison in Baku. There he led the imprisoned Bolsheviks, organised discussion groups, and ordered the killing of suspected informants. He was eventually sentenced to two years exile in the village of Solvychegodsk, Vologda Province, arriving there in February 1909. In June, he escaped the village and made it to Kotlas disguised as a woman and from there to Saint Petersburg. In March 1910, he was arrested again and sent back to Solvychegodsk. There he had affairs with at least two women; his landlady, Maria Kuzakova, later gave birth to his second son, Konstantin. In June 1911, Stalin was given permission to move to Vologda, where he stayed for two months, having a relationship with Pelageya Onufrieva. He escaped to Saint Petersburg, where he was arrested in September 1911 and sentenced to a further three-year exile in Vologda.

1912–1917: Rise to the Central Committee and editorship of Pravda 

In January 1912, while Stalin was in exile, the first Bolshevik Central Committee was elected at the Prague Conference. Shortly after the conference, Lenin and Grigory Zinoviev decided to co-opt Stalin to the committee. Still in Vologda, Stalin agreed, remaining a Central Committee member for the rest of his life. Lenin believed that Stalin, as a Georgian, would help secure support for the Bolsheviks from the empire's minority ethnicities. In February 1912, Stalin again escaped to Saint Petersburg, tasked with converting the Bolshevik weekly newspaper, Zvezda ("Star") into a daily, Pravda ("Truth"). The new newspaper was launched in April 1912, although Stalin's role as editor was kept secret.

In May 1912, he was arrested again and imprisoned in the Shpalerhy Prison, before being sentenced to three years exile in Siberia. In July, he arrived at the Siberian village of Narym, where he shared a room with a fellow Bolshevik Yakov Sverdlov. After two months, Stalin and Sverdlov escaped back to Saint Petersburg.
During a brief period back in Tiflis, Stalin and the Outfit planned the ambush of a mail coach, during which most of the group — although not Stalin — were apprehended by the authorities. Stalin returned to Saint Petersburg, where he continued editing and writing articles for Pravda.

After the October 1912 Duma elections, where six Bolsheviks and six Mensheviks were elected, Stalin wrote articles calling for reconciliation between the two Marxist factions, for which Lenin criticised him. In late 1912, Stalin twice crossed into the Austro-Hungarian Empire to visit Lenin in Cracow, eventually bowing to Lenin's opposition to reunification with the Mensheviks. In January 1913, Stalin travelled to Vienna, where he researched the 'national question' of how the Bolsheviks should deal with the Russian Empire's national and ethnic minorities. Lenin, who encouraged Stalin to write an article on the subject, wanted to attract those groups to the Bolshevik cause by offering them the right of secession from the Russian state, but also hoped they would remain part of a future Bolshevik-governed Russia.

Stalin's article Marxism and the National Question was first published in the March, April, and May 1913 issues of the Bolshevik journal Prosveshcheniye; Lenin was pleased with it. According to Montefiore, this was "Stalin's most famous work". The article was published under the pseudonym "K. Stalin", a name he had used since 1912. Derived from the Russian word for steel (stal), this has been translated as "Man of Steel"; Stalin may have intended it to imitate Lenin's pseudonym. Stalin retained the name for the rest of his life, possibly because it was used on the article that established his reputation among the Bolsheviks.

In February 1913, Stalin was arrested while back in Saint Petersburg. He was sentenced to four years exile in Turukhansk, a remote part of Siberia from which escape was particularly difficult. In August, he arrived in the village of Monastyrskoe, although after four weeks was relocated to the hamlet of Kostino. In March 1914, concerned over a potential escape attempt, the authorities moved Stalin to the hamlet of Kureika on the edge of the Arctic Circle. In the hamlet, Stalin had a relationship with Lidia Pereprygina, who was fourteen at the time but within the legal age of consent in Tsarist Russia. In or about December 1914, their child was born but the infant soon died. Their second child, Alexander, was born circa April 1917.

In Kureika, Stalin lived among the indigenous Tunguses and Ostyak peoples, and spent much of his time fishing.

1917: Russian Revolution 
While Stalin was in exile, Russia entered the First World War, and in October 1916 Stalin and other exiled Bolsheviks were conscripted into the Russian Army, leaving for Monastyrskoe. They arrived in Krasnoyarsk in February 1917, where a medical examiner ruled Stalin unfit for military service because of his crippled arm. Stalin was required to serve four more months of his exile, and he successfully requested that he serve it in nearby Achinsk. Stalin was in the city when the February Revolution took place; uprisings broke out in Petrograd — as Saint Petersburg had been renamed — and Tsar Nicholas II abdicated to escape being violently overthrown. The Russian Empire became a de facto republic, headed by a Provisional Government dominated by liberals. In a celebratory mood, Stalin travelled by train to Petrograd in March. There, Stalin and a fellow Bolshevik Lev Kamenev assumed control of Pravda, and Stalin was appointed the Bolshevik representative to the Executive Committee of the Petrograd Soviet, an influential council of the city's workers. In April, Stalin came third in the Bolshevik elections for the party's Central Committee; Lenin came first and Zinoviev came second. This reflected his senior standing in the party at the time.

Stalin helped organise the July Days uprising, an armed display of strength by Bolshevik supporters. After the demonstration was suppressed, the Provisional Government initiated a crackdown on the Bolsheviks, raiding Pravda. During this raid, Stalin smuggled Lenin out of the newspaper's office and took charge of the Bolshevik leader's safety, moving him between Petrograd safe houses before smuggling him to Razliv. In Lenin's absence, Stalin continued editing Pravda and served as acting leader of the Bolsheviks, overseeing the party's Sixth Congress, which was held covertly. Lenin began calling for the Bolsheviks to seize power by toppling the Provisional Government in a coup d'état. Stalin and a fellow senior Bolshevik Leon Trotsky both endorsed Lenin's plan of action, but it was initially opposed by Kamenev and other party members. Lenin returned to Petrograd and secured a majority in favour of a coup at a meeting of the Central Committee on 10 October.

On 24 October, police raided the Bolshevik newspaper offices, smashing machinery and presses; Stalin salvaged some of this equipment to continue his activities. In the early hours of 25 October, Stalin joined Lenin in a Central Committee meeting in the Smolny Institute, from where the Bolshevik coup — the October Revolution — was directed. Bolshevik militia seized Petrograd's electric power station, main post office, state bank, telephone exchange, and several bridges. A Bolshevik-controlled ship, the Aurora, opened fire on the Winter Palace; the Provisional Government's assembled delegates surrendered and were arrested by the Bolsheviks. Although he had been tasked with briefing the Bolshevik delegates of the Second Congress of Soviets about the developing situation, Stalin's role in the coup had not been publicly visible. Trotsky and other later Bolshevik opponents of Stalin used this as evidence that his role in the coup had been insignificant, although later historians reject this. According to the historian Oleg Khlevniuk, Stalin "filled an important role [in the October Revolution]... as a senior Bolshevik, member of the party's Central Committee, and editor of its main newspaper"; the historian Stephen Kotkin similarly noted that Stalin had been "in the thick of events" in the build-up to the coup.

In Lenin's government

1917–1918: Consolidating power 

On 26 October 1917, Lenin declared himself chairman of a new government, the Council of People's Commissars ("Sovnarkom"). Stalin backed Lenin's decision not to form a coalition with the Mensheviks and Socialist Revolutionary Party, although they did form a coalition government with the Left Socialist Revolutionaries. Stalin became part of an informal foursome leading the government, alongside Lenin, Trotsky, and Sverdlov; of these, Sverdlov was regularly absent and died in March 1919. Stalin's office was based near to Lenin's in the Smolny Institute, and he and Trotsky were the only individuals allowed access to Lenin's study without an appointment. Although not so publicly well known as Lenin or Trotsky, Stalin's importance among the Bolsheviks grew. He co-signed Lenin's decrees shutting down hostile newspapers, and along with Sverdlov, he chaired the sessions of the committee drafting a constitution for the new Russian Soviet Federative Socialist Republic. He strongly supported Lenin's formation of the Cheka security service and the subsequent Red Terror that it initiated; noting that state violence had proved an effective tool for capitalist powers, he believed that it would prove the same for the Soviet government. Unlike senior Bolsheviks like Kamenev and Nikolai Bukharin, Stalin never expressed concern about the rapid growth and expansion of the Cheka and Red Terror.

Having dropped his editorship of Pravda, Stalin was appointed the People's Commissar for Nationalities. He took Nadezhda Alliluyeva as his secretary and at some point married her, although the wedding date is unknown. In November 1917, he signed the Decree on Nationality, according ethnic and national minorities living in Russia the right of secession and self-determination. The decree's purpose was primarily strategic; the Bolsheviks wanted to gain favour among ethnic minorities but hoped that the latter would not actually desire independence. That month, he travelled to Helsinki to talk with the Finnish Social-Democrats, granting Finland's request for independence in December. His department allocated funds for establishment of presses and schools in the languages of various ethnic minorities. Socialist revolutionaries accused Stalin's talk of federalism and national self-determination as a front for Sovnarkom's centralising and imperialist policies.

Because of the ongoing First World War, in which Russia was fighting the Central Powers of Germany and Austria-Hungary, Lenin's government relocated from Petrograd to Moscow in March 1918. Stalin, Trotsky, Sverdlov, and Lenin lived at the Kremlin. Stalin supported Lenin's desire to sign an armistice with the Central Powers regardless of the cost in territory. Stalin thought it necessary because — unlike Lenin — he was unconvinced that Europe was on the verge of proletarian revolution. Lenin eventually convinced the other senior Bolsheviks of his viewpoint, resulting in signing of the Treaty of Brest-Litovsk in March 1918. The treaty gave vast areas of land and resources to the Central Powers and angered many in Russia; the Left Socialist Revolutionaries withdrew from the coalition government over the issue. The governing RSDLP party was soon renamed, becoming the Russian Communist Party.

1918–1921: Military command 
After the Bolsheviks seized power, both right and left-wing armies rallied against them, generating the Russian Civil War. To secure access to the dwindling food supply, in May 1918 Sovnarkom sent Stalin to Tsaritsyn to take charge of food procurement in southern Russia. Eager to prove himself as a commander, once there he took control of regional military operations. He befriended two military figures, Kliment Voroshilov and Semyon Budyonny, who would form the nucleus of his military and political support base. Believing that victory was assured by numerical superiority, he sent large numbers of Red Army troops into battle against the region's anti-Bolshevik White armies, resulting in heavy losses; Lenin was concerned by this costly tactic. In Tsaritsyn, Stalin commanded the local Cheka branch to execute suspected counter-revolutionaries, sometimes without trial and — in contravention of government orders — purged the military and food collection agencies of middle-class specialists, some of whom he also executed. His use of state violence and terror was at a greater scale than most Bolshevik leaders approved of; for instance, he ordered several villages to be torched to ensure compliance with his food procurement program.

In December 1918, Stalin was sent to Perm to lead an inquiry into how Alexander Kolchak's White forces had been able to decimate Red troops based there. He returned to Moscow between January and March 1919, before being assigned to the Western Front at Petrograd. When the Red Third Regiment defected, he ordered the public execution of captured defectors. In September he was returned to the Southern Front. During the war, he proved his worth to the Central Committee, displaying decisiveness, determination, and willingness to take on responsibility in conflict situations. At the same time, he disregarded orders and repeatedly threatened to resign when affronted. He was reprimanded by Lenin at the 8th Party Congress for employing tactics which resulted in far too many deaths of Red Army soldiers. In November 1919, the government nonetheless awarded him the Order of the Red Banner for his wartime service.

The Bolsheviks won the Russian civil war by the end of 1919. By that time, Sovnarkom had turned its attention to spreading proletarian revolution abroad, to this end forming the Communist International in March 1919; Stalin attended its inaugural ceremony. Although Stalin did not share Lenin's belief that Europe's proletariat were on the verge of revolution, he acknowledged that as long as it stood alone, Soviet Russia remained vulnerable. In December 1918, he drew up decrees recognising Marxist-governed Soviet republics in Estonia, Lithuania, and Latvia; during the civil war these Marxist governments were overthrown and the Baltic countries became fully independent of Russia, an act Stalin regarded as illegitimate. In February 1920, he was appointed to head the Workers' and Peasants' Inspectorate; that same month he was also transferred to the Caucasian Front.

Following earlier clashes between Polish and Russian troops, the Polish–Soviet War broke out in early 1920, with the Poles invading Ukraine and taking Kiev on 7 May. On 26 May, Stalin was moved to Ukraine, on the Southwest Front. The Red Army retook Kiev on 10 June and soon forced the Polish troops back into Poland. On 16 July, the Central Committee decided to take the war into Polish territory. Lenin believed that the Polish proletariat would rise up to support the Russians against Józef Piłsudski's Polish government. Stalin had cautioned against this; he believed that nationalism would lead the Polish working-classes to support their government's war effort. He also believed that the Red Army was ill-prepared to conduct an offensive war and that it would give White Armies a chance to resurface in Crimea, potentially reigniting the civil war. Stalin lost the argument, after which he accepted Lenin's decision and supported it. Along the Southwest Front, he became determined to conquer Lvov; in focusing on this goal he disobeyed orders in early August to transfer his troops to assist Mikhail Tukhachevsky's forces that were attacking Warsaw.

In mid-August 1920, the Poles repulsed the Russian advance, and Stalin returned to Moscow to attend the Politburo meeting. In Moscow, Lenin and Trotsky blamed him for his behaviour in the Polish–Soviet war. Stalin felt humiliated and under-appreciated; on 17 August, he demanded demission from the military, which was granted on 1 September. At the 9th Bolshevik Conference in late September, Trotsky accused Stalin of "strategic mistakes" in his handling of the war. Trotsky claimed that Stalin sabotaged the campaign by disobeying troop transfer orders. Lenin joined Trotsky in criticising him, and nobody spoke on his behalf at the conference. Stalin felt disgraced and increased his antipathy toward Trotsky. The Polish-Soviet War ended on 18 March 1921, when a peace treaty was signed in Riga.

1921–1923: Lenin's final years 

The Soviet government sought to bring neighbouring states under its domination; in February 1921 it invaded the Menshevik-governed Georgia, while in April 1921, Stalin ordered the Red Army into Turkestan to reassert Russian state control. As People's Commissar for Nationalities, Stalin believed that each national and ethnic group should have the right to self-expression, facilitated through "autonomous republics" within the Russian state in which they could oversee various regional affairs. In taking this view, some Marxists accused him of bending too much to bourgeois nationalism, while others accused him of remaining too Russocentric by seeking to retain these nations within the Russian state.

Stalin's native Caucasus posed a particular problem because of its highly multi-ethnic mix. Stalin opposed the idea of separate Georgian, Armenian, and Azeri autonomous republics, arguing that these would likely oppress ethnic minorities within their respective territories; instead he called for a Transcaucasian Socialist Federative Soviet Republic. The Georgian Communist Party opposed the idea, resulting in the Georgian affair. In mid-1921, Stalin returned to the southern Caucasus, there calling on Georgian Communists to avoid the chauvinistic Georgian nationalism which marginalised the Abkhazian, Ossetian, and Adjarian minorities in Georgia. On this trip, Stalin met with his son Yakov, and brought him back to Moscow; Nadezhda had given birth to another of Stalin's sons, Vasily, in March 1921.

After the civil war, workers' strikes and peasant uprisings broke out across Russia, largely in opposition to Sovnarkom's food requisitioning project; as an antidote, Lenin introduced market-oriented reforms: the New Economic Policy (NEP). There was also internal turmoil in the Communist Party, as Trotsky led a faction calling for abolition of trade unions; Lenin opposed this, and Stalin helped rally opposition to Trotsky's position. Stalin also agreed to supervise the Department of Agitation and Propaganda in the Central Committee Secretariat. At the 11th Party Congress in 1922, Lenin nominated Stalin as the party's new General Secretary. Although concerns were expressed that adopting this new post on top of his others would overstretch his workload and give him too much power, Stalin was appointed to the position. For Lenin, it was advantageous to have a key ally in this crucial post.

In May 1922, a massive stroke left Lenin partially paralysed. Residing at his Gorki dacha, Lenin's main connection to Sovnarkom was through Stalin, who was a regular visitor. Lenin twice asked Stalin to procure poison so that he could commit suicide, but Stalin never did so. Despite this comradeship, Lenin disliked what he referred to as Stalin's "Asiatic" manner and told his sister Maria that Stalin was "not intelligent". Lenin and Stalin argued on the issue of foreign trade; Lenin believed that the Soviet state should have a monopoly on foreign trade, but Stalin supported Grigori Sokolnikov's view that doing so was impractical at that stage. Another disagreement came over the Georgian affair, with Lenin backing the Georgian Central Committee's desire for a Georgian Soviet Republic over Stalin's idea of a Transcaucasian one.

They also disagreed on the nature of the Soviet state. Lenin called for establishment of a new federation named the "Union of Soviet Republics of Europe and Asia", reflecting his desire for expansion across the two continents and insisted that the Russian state should join this union on equal terms with the other Soviet states. Stalin believed this would encourage independence sentiment among non-Russians, instead arguing that ethnic minorities would be content as "autonomous republics" within the Russian Soviet Federative Socialist Republic. Lenin accused Stalin of "Great Russian chauvinism"; Stalin accused Lenin of "national liberalism". A compromise was reached, in which the federation would be renamed the "Union of Soviet Socialist Republics" (USSR). The USSR's formation was ratified in December 1922; although officially a federal system, all major decisions were taken by the governing Politburo of the Communist Party of the Soviet Union in Moscow.

Their differences also became personal; Lenin was particularly angered when Stalin was rude to his wife Krupskaya during a telephone conversation. In the final years of his life, Krupskaya provided governing figures with Lenin's Testament, a series of increasingly disparaging notes about Stalin. These criticised Stalin's rude manners and excessive power, suggesting that Stalin should be removed from the position of general secretary. Some historians have questioned whether Lenin ever produced these, suggesting instead that they may have been written by Krupskaya, who had personal differences with Stalin; Stalin, however, never publicly voiced concerns about their authenticity.

Consolidation of power

1924–1927: Succeeding Lenin 

Lenin died in January 1924. Stalin took charge of the funeral and was one of its pallbearers; against the wishes of Lenin's widow, the Politburo embalmed his corpse and placed it within a mausoleum in Moscow's Red Square. It was incorporated into a growing personality cult devoted to Lenin, with Petrograd being renamed "Leningrad" that year. To bolster his image as a devoted Leninist, Stalin gave nine lectures at Sverdlov University on the "Foundations of Leninism", later published in book form. During the 13th Party Congress in May 1924, "Lenin's Testament" was read only to the leaders of the provincial delegations. Embarrassed by its contents, Stalin offered his resignation as General Secretary; this act of humility saved him and he was retained in the position.

As General Secretary, Stalin had a free hand in making appointments to his own staff, implanting his loyalists throughout the party and administration. Favouring new Communist Party members from proletarian backgrounds, to the "Old Bolsheviks" who tended to be middle class university graduates, he ensured he had loyalists dispersed across the country's regions. Stalin had much contact with young party functionaries, and the desire for promotion led many provincial figures to seek to impress Stalin and gain his favour. Stalin also developed close relations with the trio at the heart of the secret police (first the Cheka and then its replacement, the State Political Directorate): Felix Dzerzhinsky, Genrikh Yagoda, and Vyacheslav Menzhinsky. In his private life, he divided his time between his Kremlin apartment and a dacha at Zubalova; his wife gave birth to a daughter, Svetlana, in February 1926.

In the wake of Lenin's death, various protagonists emerged in the struggle to become his successor: alongside Stalin was Trotsky, Zinoviev, Kamenev, Bukharin, Alexei Rykov, and Mikhail Tomsky. Stalin saw Trotsky — whom he personally despised — as the main obstacle to his dominance within the party. While Lenin had been ill Stalin had forged an anti-Trotsky alliance with Kamenev and Zinoviev. Although Zinoviev was concerned about Stalin's growing authority, he rallied behind him at the 13th Congress as a counterweight to Trotsky, who now led a party faction known as the Left Opposition. The Left Opposition believed the NEP conceded too much to capitalism; Stalin was called a "rightist" for his support of the policy. Stalin built up a retinue of his supporters in the Central Committee, while the Left Opposition were gradually removed from their positions of influence. He was supported in this by Bukharin, who, like Stalin, believed that the Left Opposition's proposals would plunge the Soviet Union into instability.

In late 1924, Stalin moved against Kamenev and Zinoviev, removing their supporters from key positions. In 1925, the two moved into open opposition to Stalin and Bukharin. At the 14th Party Congress in December, they launched an attack against Stalin's faction, but it was unsuccessful. Stalin in turn accused Kamenev and Zinoviev of reintroducing factionalism — and thus instability — into the party. In mid-1926, Kamenev and Zinoviev joined with Trotsky's supporters to form the United Opposition against Stalin; in October they agreed to stop factional activity under threat of expulsion, and later publicly recanted their views under Stalin's command. The factionalist arguments continued, with Stalin threatening to resign in October and then December 1926 and again in December 1927. In October 1927, Zinoviev and Trotsky were removed from the Central Committee; the latter was exiled to Kazakhstan and later deported from the country in 1929. Some of those United Opposition members who were repentant were later rehabilitated and returned to government.

Stalin was now the party's supreme leader, although he was not the head of government, a task he entrusted to his key ally Vyacheslav Molotov. Other important supporters on the Politburo were Voroshilov, Lazar Kaganovich, and Sergo Ordzhonikidze, with Stalin ensuring his allies ran the various state institutions. According to Montefiore, at this point "Stalin was the leader of the oligarchs but he was far from a dictator". His growing influence was reflected in naming of various locations after him; in June 1924 the Ukrainian mining town of Yuzovka became Stalino, and in April 1925, Tsaritsyn was renamed Stalingrad on the order of Mikhail Kalinin and Avel Enukidze.

In 1926, Stalin published On Questions of Leninism. Here, he argued for the concept of "Socialism in One Country", which he presented as an orthodox Leninist perspective. It nevertheless clashed with established Bolshevik views that socialism could not be established in one country but could only be achieved globally through the process of world revolution. In 1927, there was some argument in the party over Soviet policy regarding China. Stalin had called for the Chinese Communists to ally themselves with Kuomintang (KMT) nationalists, viewing a Communist-Kuomintang alliance as the best bulwark against Japanese imperial expansionism. Instead, the KMT repressed the Communists and a civil war broke out between the two sides.

1927–1931: Dekulakisation, collectivisation, and industrialisation

Economic policy

The Soviet Union lagged behind the industrial development of Western countries, and there had been a shortfall of grain; 1927 produced only 70% of grain produced in 1926. Stalin's government feared attack from Japan, France, the United Kingdom, Poland, and Romania. Many Communists, including in Komsomol, OGPU, and the Red Army, were eager to be rid of the NEP and its market-oriented approach; they had concerns about those who profited from the policy: affluent peasants known as "kulaks" and small business owners or "Nepmen". At this point, Stalin turned against the NEP, which put him on a course to the "left" even of Trotsky or Zinoviev.

In early 1928 Stalin travelled to Novosibirsk, where he alleged that kulaks were hoarding their grain and ordered that the kulaks be arrested and their grain confiscated, with Stalin bringing much of the area's grain back to Moscow with him in February. At his command, grain procurement squads surfaced across Western Siberia and the Urals, with violence breaking out between these squads and the peasantry. Stalin announced that both kulaks and the "middle peasants" must be coerced into releasing their harvest. Bukharin and several other Central Committee members were angry that they had not been consulted about this measure, which they deemed rash. In January 1930, the Politburo approved the liquidation of the kulak class; accused kulaks were rounded up and exiled to other parts of the country or to concentration camps. Large numbers died during the journey. By July 1930, over 320,000 households had been affected by the de-kulakisation policy. According to Stalin biographer Dmitri Volkogonov, de-kulakisation was "the first mass terror applied by Stalin in his own country."

In 1929, the Politburo announced the mass collectivisation of agriculture, establishing both kolkhozy collective farms and sovkhoz state farms. Stalin barred kulaks from joining these collectives. Although officially voluntary, many peasants joined the collectives out of fear they would face the fate of the kulaks; others joined amid intimidation and violence from party loyalists. By 1932, about 62% of households involved in agriculture were part of collectives, and by 1936 this had risen to 90%. Many of the collectivised peasants resented the loss of their private farmland, and productivity slumped. Famine broke out in many areas, with the Politburo frequently ordering distribution of emergency food relief to these regions.

Armed peasant uprisings against dekulakisation and collectivisation broke out in Ukraine, northern Caucasus, southern Russia, and central Asia, reaching their apex in March 1930; these were suppressed by the Red Army. Stalin responded to the uprisings with an article insisting that collectivisation was voluntary and blaming any violence and other excesses on local officials. Although he and Stalin had been close for many years, Bukharin expressed concerns about these policies; he regarded them as a return to Lenin's old "war communism" policy and believed that it would fail. By mid-1928 he was unable to rally sufficient support in the party to oppose the reforms. In November 1929 Stalin removed him from the Politburo.

Officially, the Soviet Union had replaced the "irrationality" and "wastefulness" of a market economy with a planned economy organised along a long-term, precise, and scientific framework; in reality, Soviet economics were based on ad hoc commandments issued from the centre, often to make short-term targets. In 1928, the first five-year plan was launched, its main focus on boosting heavy industry; it was finished a year ahead of schedule, in 1932. The USSR underwent a massive economic transformation. New mines were opened, new cities like Magnitogorsk constructed, and work on the White Sea-Baltic Canal began. Millions of peasants moved to the cities, although urban house building could not keep up with the demand. Large debts were accrued purchasing foreign-made machinery.

Many of major construction projects, including the White Sea-Baltic Canal and the Moscow Metro, were constructed largely through forced labour. The last elements of workers' control over industry were removed, with factory managers increasing their authority and receiving privileges and perks; Stalin defended wage disparity by pointing to Marx's argument that it was necessary during the lower stages of socialism. To promote intensification of labour, a series of medals and awards as well as the Stakhanovite movement were introduced. Stalin's message was that socialism was being established in the USSR while capitalism was crumbling amid the Wall Street crash. His speeches and articles reflected his utopian vision of the Soviet Union rising to unparalleled heights of human development, creating a "new Soviet person".

Cultural and foreign policy
In 1928, Stalin declared that class war between the proletariat and their enemies would intensify as socialism developed. He warned of a "danger from the right", including in the Communist Party itself. The first major show trial in the USSR was the Shakhty Trial of 1928, in which several middle-class "industrial specialists" were convicted of sabotage. From 1929 to 1930, further show trials were held to intimidate opposition: these included the Industrial Party Trial, Menshevik Trial, and Metro-Vickers Trial. Aware that the ethnic Russian majority may have concerns about being ruled by a Georgian, he promoted ethnic Russians throughout the state hierarchy and made the Russian language compulsory throughout schools and offices, albeit to be used in tandem with local languages in areas with non-Russian majorities. Nationalist sentiment among ethnic minorities was suppressed. Conservative social policies were promoted to enhance social discipline and boost population growth; this included a focus on strong family units and motherhood, re-criminalisation of homosexuality, restrictions placed on abortion and divorce, and abolition of the Zhenotdel women's department.

Stalin desired a "cultural revolution", entailing both creation of a culture for the "masses" and wider dissemination of previously elite culture. He oversaw proliferation of schools, newspapers, and libraries, as well as advancement of literacy and numeracy. Socialist realism was promoted throughout arts, while Stalin personally wooed prominent writers, namely Maxim Gorky, Mikhail Sholokhov, and Aleksey Nikolayevich Tolstoy. He also expressed patronage for scientists whose research fitted within his preconceived interpretation of Marxism; for instance, he endorsed research of an agrobiologist Trofim Lysenko despite the fact that it was rejected by the majority of Lysenko's scientific peers as pseudo-scientific. The government's anti-religious campaign was re-intensified, with increased funding given to the League of Militant Atheists. Priests, imams, and Buddhist monks faced persecution. Many religious buildings were demolished, most notably Moscow's Cathedral of Christ the Saviour, destroyed in 1931 to make way for the (never completed) Palace of the Soviets. Religion retained an influence over much of the population; in the 1937 census, 57% of respondents were willing to admit to being religious.

Throughout the 1920s and beyond, Stalin placed a high priority on foreign policy. He personally met with a range of Western visitors, including George Bernard Shaw and H. G. Wells, both of whom were impressed with him. Through the Communist International, Stalin's government exerted a strong influence over Marxist parties elsewhere in the world; initially, Stalin left the running of the organisation largely to Bukharin. At its 6th Congress in July 1928, Stalin informed delegates that the main threat to socialism came not from the right but from non-Marxist socialists and social democrats, whom he called "social fascists"; Stalin recognised that in many countries, the social democrats were the Marxist-Leninists' main rivals for working-class support. This preoccupation with opposing rival leftists concerned Bukharin, who regarded the growth of fascism and the far right across Europe as a far greater threat. After Bukharin's departure, Stalin placed the Communist International under the administration of Dmitry Manuilsky and Osip Piatnitsky.

Stalin faced problems in his family life. In 1929, his son Yakov unsuccessfully attempted suicide; his failure earned Stalin's contempt. His relationship with Nadezhda was also strained amid their arguments and her mental health problems. In November 1932, after a group dinner in the Kremlin in which Stalin flirted with other women, Nadezhda shot herself.
Publicly, the cause of death was given as appendicitis; Stalin also concealed the real cause of death from his children. Stalin's friends noted that he underwent a significant change following her suicide, becoming emotionally harder.

1932–1939: Major crises

Famine

Within the Soviet Union, there was widespread civic disgruntlement against Stalin's government. Social unrest, previously restricted largely to the countryside, was increasingly evident in urban areas, prompting Stalin to ease on some of his economic policies in 1932. In May 1932, he introduced a system of kolkhoz markets where peasants could trade their surplus produce. At the same time, penal sanctions became more severe; at Stalin's instigation, in August 1932 a decree was introduced wherein the theft of even a handful of grain could be a capital offence. The second five-year plan had its production quotas reduced from that of the first, with the main emphasis now being on improving living conditions. It therefore emphasised the expansion of housing space and the production of consumer goods. Like its predecessor, this plan was repeatedly amended to meet changing situations; there was for instance an increasing emphasis placed on armament production after Adolf Hitler became German chancellor in 1933.

The Soviet Union experienced a major famine which peaked in the winter of 1932–33; between five and seven million people died. The worst affected areas were Ukraine and the North Caucasus, although the famine also affected Kazakhstan and several Russian provinces. Historians have long debated whether Stalin's government had intended the famine to occur or not; there are no known documents in which Stalin or his government explicitly called for starvation to be used against the population. The 1931 and 1932 harvests had been poor ones because of weather conditions and had followed several years in which lower productivity had resulted in a gradual decline in output. Government policies—including the focus on rapid industrialisation, the socialisation of livestock, and the emphasis on sown areas over crop rotation—exacerbated the problem; the state had also failed to build reserve grain stocks for such an emergency. Stalin blamed the famine on hostile elements and sabotage within the peasantry; his government provided small amounts of food to famine-struck rural areas, although this was wholly insufficient to deal with the levels of starvation. The Soviet government believed that food supplies should be prioritised for the urban workforce; for Stalin, the fate of Soviet industrialisation was far more important than the lives of the peasantry. Grain exports, which were a major means of Soviet payment for machinery, declined heavily. Stalin would not acknowledge that his policies had contributed to the famine, the existence of which was kept secret from foreign observers.

Ideological and foreign affairs

In 1935–36, Stalin oversaw a new constitution; its dramatic liberal features were designed as propaganda weapons, for all power rested in the hands of Stalin and his Politburo. He declared that "socialism, which is the first phase of communism, has basically been achieved in this country". In 1938, The History of the Communist Party of the Soviet Union (Bolsheviks), colloquially known as the Short Course, was released; biographer Robert Conquest later referred to it as the "central text of Stalinism". A number of authorised Stalin biographies were also published, although Stalin generally wanted to be portrayed as the embodiment of the Communist Party rather than have his life story explored. During the later 1930s, Stalin placed "a few limits on the worship of his own greatness". By 1938, Stalin's inner circle had gained a degree of stability, containing the personalities who would remain there until Stalin's death.

Seeking improved international relations, in 1934 the Soviet Union secured membership of the League of Nations, from which it had previously been excluded. Stalin initiated confidential communications with Hitler in October 1933, shortly after the latter came to power in Germany. Stalin admired Hitler, particularly his manoeuvres to remove rivals within the Nazi Party in the Night of the Long Knives. Stalin nevertheless recognised the threat posed by fascism and sought to establish better links with the liberal democracies of Western Europe; in May 1935, the Soviets signed a treaty of mutual assistance with France and Czechoslovakia. At the Communist International's 7th Congress, held in July–August 1935, the Soviet government encouraged Marxist-Leninists to unite with other leftists as part of a popular front against fascism. In turn, the anti-communist governments of Nazi Germany, Fascist Italy, and Imperial Japan signed the Anti-Comintern Pact of 1936.

When the Spanish Civil War broke out in July 1936, the Soviets sent 648 aircraft and 407 tanks to the left-wing Republican faction; these were accompanied by 3,000 Soviet troops and 42,000 members of the International Brigades set up by the Communist International. Stalin took a strong personal involvement in the Spanish situation. Germany and Italy backed the Nationalist faction, which was ultimately victorious in March 1939. With the outbreak of the Second Sino-Japanese War in July 1937, the Soviet Union and China signed a non-aggression pact the following August. Stalin aided the Chinese as the KMT and the Communists had suspended their civil war and formed the desired United Front.

The Great Terror

Stalin often gave conflicting signals regarding state repression. In May 1933, he released from prison many convicted of minor offences, ordering the security services not to enact further mass arrests and deportations. In September 1934, he launched a commission to investigate false imprisonments; that same month he called for the execution of workers at the Stalin Metallurgical Factory accused of spying for Japan. This mixed approach began to change in December 1934, after prominent party member Sergey Kirov was murdered. After the murder, Stalin became increasingly concerned by the threat of assassination, improved his personal security, and rarely went out in public. State repression intensified after Kirov's death; Stalin instigated this, reflecting his prioritisation of security above other considerations. Stalin issued a decree establishing NKVD troikas which could mete out rulings without involving the courts. In 1935, he ordered the NKVD to expel suspected counter-revolutionaries from urban areas; in early 1935, over 11,000 were expelled from Leningrad. In 1936, Nikolai Yezhov became head of the NKVD.

Stalin orchestrated the arrest of many former opponents in the Communist Party as well as sitting members of the Central Committee: denounced as Western-backed mercenaries, many were imprisoned or exiled internally. The first Moscow Trial took place in August 1936; Kamenev and Zinoviev were among those accused of plotting assassinations, found guilty in a show trial, and executed. The second Moscow Show Trial took place in January 1937, and the third in March 1938, in which Bukharin and Rykov were accused of involvement in the alleged Trotskyite-Zinovievite terrorist plot and sentenced to death. By late 1937, all remnants of collective leadership were gone from the Politburo, which was controlled entirely by Stalin. There were mass expulsions from the party, with Stalin commanding foreign communist parties to also purge anti-Stalinist elements.

Repressions further intensified in December 1936 and remained at a high level until November 1938, a period known as the Great Purge. By the latter part of 1937, the purges had moved beyond the party and were affecting the wider population. In July 1937, the Politburo ordered a purge of "anti-Soviet elements" in society, targeting anti-Stalin Bolsheviks, former Mensheviks and Socialist Revolutionaries, priests, ex-White Army soldiers, and common criminals. That month, Stalin and Yezhov signed Order No. 00447, listing 268,950 people for arrest, of whom 75,950 were executed. He also initiated "national operations", the ethnic cleansing of non-Soviet ethnic groups—among them Poles, Germans, Latvians, Finns, Greeks, Koreans, and Chinese—through internal or external exile. During these years, approximately 1.6 million people were arrested, 700,000 were shot, and an unknown number died under NKVD torture.

During the 1930s and 1940s, NKVD groups assassinated defectors and opponents abroad; in August 1940, Trotsky was assassinated in Mexico, eliminating the last of Stalin's opponents among the former Party leadership. In May, this was followed by the arrest of most members of the military Supreme Command and mass arrests throughout the military, often on fabricated charges. These purges replaced most of the party's old guard with younger officials who did not remember a time before Stalin's leadership and who were regarded as more personally loyal to him. Party functionaries readily carried out their commands and sought to ingratiate themselves with Stalin to avoid becoming the victim of the purge. Such functionaries often carried out a greater number of arrests and executions than their quotas set by Stalin's central government.

Stalin initiated all key decisions during the Terror, personally directing many of its operations and taking an interest in their implementation. His motives in doing so have been much debated by historians. His personal writings from the period were — according to Khlevniuk — "unusually convoluted and incoherent", filled with claims about enemies encircling him. He was particularly concerned at the success that right-wing forces had in overthrowing the leftist Spanish government, fearing a domestic fifth column in the event of future war with Japan and Germany. The Great Terror ended when Yezhov was removed as the head of the NKVD, to be replaced by Lavrentiy Beria, a man totally devoted to Stalin. Yezhov was arrested in April 1939 and executed in 1940. The Terror damaged the Soviet Union's reputation abroad, particularly among sympathetic leftists. As it wound down, Stalin sought to deflect responsibility from himself, blaming its "excesses" and "violations of law" on Yezhov. According to historian James Harris, contemporary archival research shows that the motivation behind the purges was not Stalin attempting to establish his own personal dictatorship; evidence suggests he was committed to building the socialist state envisioned by Lenin. The real motivation for the terror, according to Harris, was an excessive fear of counterrevolution.

World War II

1939–1941: Pact with Nazi Germany 
As a Marxist–Leninist, Stalin considered conflict between competing capitalist powers inevitable; after Nazi Germany annexed Austria and then part of Czechoslovakia in 1938, he recognised a war was looming. He sought to maintain Soviet neutrality, hoping that a German war against France and Britain would lead to Soviet dominance in Europe. Militarily, the Soviets also faced a threat from the east, with Soviet troops clashing with the expansionist Japanese in the latter part of the 1930s. Stalin initiated a military build-up, with the Red Army more than doubling between January 1939 and June 1941, although in its haste to expand many of its officers were poorly trained. Between 1940 and 1941 he also purged the military, leaving it with a severe shortage of trained officers when war broke out.

As Britain and France seemed unwilling to commit to an alliance with the Soviet Union, Stalin saw a better deal with the Germans. On 3 May 1939, Stalin replaced his western-oriented foreign minister Maxim Litvinov with Vyacheslav Molotov. Germany began negotiations with the Soviets, proposing that Eastern Europe be divided between the two powers. Stalin saw this as an opportunity both for territorial expansion and temporary peace with Germany. In August 1939, the Soviet Union signed the Molotov-Ribbentrop pact with Germany, a non-aggression pact negotiated by Molotov and German foreign minister Joachim von Ribbentrop. A week later, Germany invaded Poland, sparking the UK and France to declare war on Germany. On 17 September, the Red Army entered eastern Poland, officially to restore order amid the collapse of the Polish state. On 28 September, Germany and the Soviet Union exchanged some of their newly conquered territories; Germany gained the linguistically Polish-dominated areas of Lublin Province and part of Warsaw Province while the Soviets gained Lithuania. A German–Soviet Frontier Treaty was signed shortly after, in Stalin's presence. The two states continued trading, undermining the British blockade of Germany.

The Soviets further demanded parts of eastern Finland, but the Finnish government refused. The Soviets invaded Finland in November 1939, yet despite numerical inferiority, the Finns kept the Red Army at bay. International opinion backed Finland, with the Soviets being expelled from the League of Nations. Embarrassed by their inability to defeat the Finns, the Soviets signed an interim peace treaty, in which they received territorial concessions from Finland. In June 1940, the Red Army occupied the Baltic states, which were forcibly merged into the Soviet Union in August; they also invaded and annexed Bessarabia and northern Bukovina, parts of Romania. The Soviets sought to forestall dissent in these new East European territories with mass repressions. One of the most noted instances was the Katyn massacre of April and May 1940, in which around 22,000 members of the Polish armed forces, police, and intelligentsia were executed.

The speed of the German victory over and occupation of France in mid-1940 took Stalin by surprise. He increasingly focused on appeasement with the Germans to delay any conflict with them. After the Tripartite Pact was signed by Axis Powers Germany, Japan, and Italy in October 1940, Stalin proposed that the USSR also join the Axis alliance. To demonstrate peaceful intentions toward Germany, in April 1941 the Soviets signed a neutrality pact with Japan. Although de facto head of government for a decade and a half, Stalin concluded that relations with Germany had deteriorated to such an extent that he needed to deal with the problem as de jure head of government as well: on 6 May, Stalin replaced Molotov as Premier of the Soviet Union.

1941–1942: German invasion 

In June 1941, Germany invaded the Soviet Union, initiating the war on the Eastern Front. Despite intelligence agencies repeatedly warning him of Germany's intentions, Stalin was taken by surprise. He formed a State Defense Committee, which he headed as Supreme Commander, as well as a military Supreme Command (Stavka), with Georgy Zhukov as its Chief of Staff. The German tactic of blitzkrieg was initially highly effective; the Soviet air force in the western borderlands was destroyed within two days. The German Wehrmacht pushed deep into Soviet territory; soon, Ukraine, Byelorussia, and the Baltic states were under German occupation, and Leningrad was under siege; and Soviet refugees were flooding into Moscow and surrounding cities. By July, Germany's Luftwaffe was bombing Moscow, and by October the Wehrmacht was amassing for a full assault on the capital. Plans were made for the Soviet government to evacuate to Kuibyshev, although Stalin decided to remain in Moscow, believing his flight would damage troop morale. The German advance on Moscow was halted after two months of battle in increasingly harsh weather conditions.

Going against the advice of Zhukov and other generals, Stalin emphasised attack over defence. In June 1941, he ordered a scorched earth policy of destroying infrastructure and food supplies before the Germans could seize them, also commanding the NKVD to kill around 100,000 political prisoners in areas the Wehrmacht approached. He purged the military command; several high-ranking figures were demoted or reassigned and others were arrested and executed. With Order No. 270, Stalin commanded soldiers risking capture to fight to the death describing the captured as traitors; among those taken as a prisoner of war by the Germans was Stalin's son Yakov, who died in their custody. Stalin issued Order No. 227 in July 1942, which directed that those retreating unauthorised would be placed in "penal battalions" used as cannon fodder on the front lines. Amid the fighting, both the German and Soviet armies disregarded the law of war set forth in the Geneva Conventions; the Soviets heavily publicised Nazi massacres of communists, Jews, and Romani. Stalin exploited Nazi anti-Semitism, and in April 1942 he sponsored the Jewish Anti-Fascist Committee (JAC) to garner Jewish and foreign support for the Soviet war effort.

The Soviets allied with the United Kingdom and United States; although the U.S. joined the war against Germany in 1941, little direct American assistance reached the Soviets until late 1942. Responding to the invasion, the Soviets intensified their industrial enterprises in central Russia, focusing almost entirely on production for the military. They achieved high levels of industrial productivity, outstripping that of Germany. During the war, Stalin was more tolerant of the Russian Orthodox Church, allowing it to resume some of its activities and meeting with Patriarch Sergius in September 1943. He also permitted a wider range of cultural expression, notably permitting formerly suppressed writers and artists like Anna Akhmatova and Dmitri Shostakovich to disperse their work more widely. The Internationale was dropped as the country's national anthem, to be replaced with a more patriotic song. The government increasingly promoted Pan-Slavist sentiment, while encouraging increased criticism of cosmopolitanism, particularly the idea of "rootless cosmopolitanism", an approach with particular repercussions for Soviet Jews. Comintern was dissolved in 1943, and Stalin encouraged foreign Marxist–Leninist parties to emphasise nationalism over internationalism to broaden their domestic appeal.

In April 1942, Stalin overrode Stavka by ordering the Soviets' first serious counter-attack, an attempt to seize German-held Kharkov in eastern Ukraine. This attack proved unsuccessful. That year, Hitler shifted his primary goal from an overall victory on the Eastern Front, to the goal of securing the oil fields in the southern Soviet Union crucial to a long-term German war effort. While Red Army generals saw evidence that Hitler would shift efforts south, Stalin considered this to be a flanking move in a renewed effort to take Moscow. In June 1942, the German Army began a major offensive in Southern Russia, threatening Stalingrad; Stalin ordered the Red Army to hold the city at all costs. This resulted in the protracted Battle of Stalingrad. In December 1942, he placed Konstantin Rokossovski in charge of holding the city. In February 1943, the German troops attacking Stalingrad surrendered. The Soviet victory there marked a major turning point in the war; in commemoration, Stalin declared himself Marshal of the Soviet Union.

1942–1945: Soviet counter-attack 

By November 1942, the Soviets had begun to repulse the important German strategic southern campaign and, although there were 2.5 million Soviet casualties in that effort, it permitted the Soviets to take the offensive for most of the rest of the war on the Eastern Front. Germany attempted an encirclement attack at Kursk, which was successfully repulsed by the Soviets. By the end of 1943, the Soviets occupied half of the territory taken by the Germans from 1941 to 1942. Soviet military industrial output also had increased substantially from late 1941 to early 1943 after Stalin had moved factories well to the east of the front, safe from German invasion and aerial assault.

In Allied countries, Stalin was increasingly depicted in a positive light over the course of the war. In 1941, the London Philharmonic Orchestra performed a concert to celebrate his birthday, and in 1942, Time magazine named him "Man of the Year". When Stalin learned that people in Western countries affectionately called him "Uncle Joe" he was initially offended, regarding it as undignified. There remained mutual suspicions between Stalin, British Prime Minister Winston Churchill, and U.S. President Franklin D. Roosevelt, who were together known as the "Big Three". Churchill flew to Moscow to visit Stalin in August 1942 and again in October 1944. Stalin scarcely left Moscow throughout the war, with Roosevelt and Churchill frustrated with his reluctance to travel to meet them.

In November 1943, Stalin met with Churchill and Roosevelt in Tehran, a location of Stalin's choosing. There, Stalin and Roosevelt got on well, with both desiring the post-war dismantling of the British Empire. At Tehran, the trio agreed that to prevent Germany rising to military prowess yet again, the German state should be broken up. Roosevelt and Churchill also agreed to Stalin's demand that the German city of Königsberg be declared Soviet territory. Stalin was impatient for the UK and U.S. to open up a Western Front to take the pressure off of the East; they eventually did so in mid-1944. Stalin insisted that, after the war, the Soviet Union should incorporate the portions of Poland it occupied pursuant to the Molotov–Ribbentrop Pact with Germany, which Churchill opposed. Discussing the fate of the Balkans, later in 1944 Churchill agreed to Stalin's suggestion that after the war, Bulgaria, Rumania, Hungary, and Yugoslavia would come under the Soviet sphere of influence while Greece would come under that of the West.

In 1944, the Soviet Union made significant advances across Eastern Europe toward Germany, including Operation Bagration, a massive offensive in the Byelorussian SSR against the German Army Group Centre. In 1944, the German armies were pushed out of the Baltic states (with the exception of the Ostland), which were then re-annexed into the Soviet Union. As the Red Army reconquered the Caucasus and Crimea, various ethnic groups living in the region—the Kalmyks, Chechens, Ingushi, Karachai, Balkars, and Crimean Tatars—were accused of having collaborated with the Germans. Using the idea of collective responsibility as a basis, Stalin's government abolished their autonomous republics and between late 1943 and 1944 deported the majority of their populations to Central Asia and Siberia. Over one million people were deported as a result of the policy.

In February 1945, the three leaders met at the Yalta Conference. Roosevelt and Churchill conceded to Stalin's demand that Germany pay the Soviet Union 20 billion dollars in reparations, and that his country be permitted to annexe Sakhalin and the Kuril Islands in exchange for entering the war against Japan. An agreement was also made that a post-war Polish government should be a coalition consisting of both communist and conservative elements. Privately, Stalin sought to ensure that Poland would come fully under Soviet influence. The Red Army withheld assistance to Polish resistance fighters battling the Germans in the Warsaw Uprising, with Stalin believing that any victorious Polish militants could interfere with his aspirations to dominate Poland through a future Marxist government. Although concealing his desires from the other Allied leaders, Stalin placed great emphasis on capturing Berlin first, believing that this would enable him to bring more of Europe under long-term Soviet control. Churchill was concerned that this was the case and unsuccessfully tried to convince the U.S. that the Western Allies should pursue the same goal.

1945: Victory 

In April 1945, the Red Army seized Berlin, Hitler committed suicide, and Germany surrendered in May. Stalin had wanted Hitler captured alive; he had his remains brought to Moscow to prevent them becoming a relic for Nazi sympathisers. As the Red Army had conquered German territory, they discovered the extermination camps that the Nazi administration had run. Many Soviet soldiers engaged in looting, pillaging, and rape, both in Germany and parts of Eastern Europe. Stalin refused to punish the offenders. After receiving a complaint about this from Yugoslav communist Milovan Djilas, Stalin asked how after experiencing the traumas of war a soldier could "react normally? And what is so awful in his having fun with a woman, after such horrors?"

With Germany defeated, Stalin switched focus to the war with Japan, transferring half a million troops to the Far East. Stalin was pressed by his allies to enter the war and wanted to cement the Soviet Union's strategic position in Asia. On 8 August, in between the U.S. atomic bombings of Hiroshima and Nagasaki, the Soviet army invaded Japanese-occupied Manchuria and defeated the Kwantung Army. These events led to the Japanese surrender and the war's end. Soviet forces continued to expand until they occupied all their territorial concessions, but the U.S. rebuffed Stalin's desire for the Red Army to take a role in the Allied occupation of Japan.

Stalin attended the Potsdam Conference in July–August 1945, alongside his new British and U.S. counterparts, Prime Minister Clement Attlee and President Harry Truman. At the conference, Stalin repeated previous promises to Churchill that he would refrain from a "Sovietization" of Eastern Europe. Stalin pushed for reparations from Germany without regard to the base minimum supply for German citizens' survival, which worried Truman and Churchill who thought that Germany would become a financial burden for Western powers. He also pushed for "war booty", which would permit the Soviet Union to directly seize property from conquered nations without quantitative or qualitative limitation, and a clause was added permitting this to occur with some limitations. Germany was divided into four zones: Soviet, U.S., British, and French, with Berlin itself—located within the Soviet area—also subdivided thusly.

Post-war era

1945–1947: Post-war reconstruction and famine 
After the war, Stalin was—according to Service—at the "apex of his career". Within the Soviet Union he was widely regarded as the embodiment of victory and patriotism. His armies controlled Central and Eastern Europe up to the River Elbe. In June 1945, Stalin adopted the title of Generalissimus, and stood atop Lenin's Mausoleum to watch a celebratory parade led by Zhukov through Red Square. At a banquet held for army commanders, he described the Russian people as "the outstanding nation" and "leading force" within the Soviet Union, the first time that he had unequivocally endorsed the Russians over other Soviet nationalities. In 1946, the state published Stalin's Collected Works. In 1947, it brought out a second edition of his official biography, which eulogised him to a greater extent than its predecessor. He was quoted in Pravda on a daily basis and pictures of him remained pervasive on the walls of workplaces and homes.

Despite his strengthened international position, Stalin was cautious about internal dissent and desire for change among the population. He was also concerned about his returning armies, who had been exposed to a wide range of consumer goods in Germany, much of which they had looted and brought back with them. In this he recalled the 1825 Decembrist Revolt by Russian soldiers returning from having defeated France in the Napoleonic Wars. He ensured that returning Soviet prisoners of war went through "filtration" camps as they arrived in the Soviet Union, in which 2,775,700 were interrogated to determine if they were traitors. About half were then imprisoned in labour camps. In the Baltic states, where there was much opposition to Soviet rule, de-kulakisation and de-clericalisation programs were initiated, resulting in 142,000 deportations between 1945 and 1949. The Gulag system of forced labour camps was expanded further. By January 1953, three per cent of the Soviet population was imprisoned or in internal exile, with 2.8 million in "special settlements" in isolated areas and another 2.5 million in camps, penal colonies, and prisons.

The NKVD were ordered to catalogue the scale of destruction during the war. It was established that 1,710 Soviet towns and 70,000 villages had been destroyed. The NKVD recorded that between 26 and 27 million Soviet citizens had been killed, with millions more being wounded, malnourished, or orphaned. In the war's aftermath, some of Stalin's associates suggested modifications to government policy. Post-war Soviet society was more tolerant than its pre-war phase in various respects. Stalin allowed the Russian Orthodox Church to retain the churches it had opened during the war. Academia and the arts were also allowed greater freedom than they had prior to 1941. Recognising the need for drastic steps to be taken to combat inflation and promote economic regeneration, in December 1947 Stalin's government devalued the rouble and abolished the ration-book system. Capital punishment was abolished in 1947 but re-instituted in 1950.

Stalin's health was deteriorating, and heart problems forced a two-month vacation in the latter part of 1945. He grew increasingly concerned that senior political and military figures might try to oust him; he prevented any of them from becoming powerful enough to rival him and had their apartments bugged with listening devices. He demoted Molotov, and increasingly favoured Beria and Malenkov for key positions. In 1949, he brought Nikita Khrushchev from Ukraine to Moscow, appointing him a Central Committee secretary and the head of the city's party branch. In the Leningrad Affair, the city's leadership was purged amid accusations of treachery; executions of many of the accused took place in 1950.

In the post-war period there were often food shortages in Soviet cities, and the USSR experienced a major famine from 1946 to 1947. Sparked by a drought and ensuing bad harvest in 1946, it was exacerbated by government policy towards food procurement, including the state's decision to build up stocks and export food internationally rather than distributing it to famine-hit areas. Current estimates indicate that between one million and 1.5 million people died from malnutrition or disease as a result. While agricultural production stagnated, Stalin focused on a series of major infrastructure projects, including the construction of hydroelectric plants, canals, and railway lines running to the polar north. Much of this was constructed by prison labour.

1947–1950: Cold War policy 

In the aftermath of the Second World War, the British Empire declined, leaving the U.S. and USSR as the dominant world powers. Tensions among these former Allies grew, resulting in the Cold War. Although Stalin publicly described the British and U.S. governments as aggressive, he thought it unlikely that a war with them would be imminent, believing that several decades of peace was likely. He nevertheless secretly intensified Soviet research into nuclear weaponry, intent on creating an atom bomb. Still, Stalin foresaw the undesirability of a nuclear conflict, saying in 1949 that "atomic weapons can hardly be used without spelling the end of the world." He personally took a keen interest in the development of the weapon. In August 1949, the bomb was successfully tested in the deserts outside Semipalatinsk in Kazakhstan. Stalin also initiated a new military build-up; the Soviet army was expanded from 2.9 million soldiers, as it stood in 1949, to 5.8 million by 1953.

The U.S. began pushing its interests on every continent, acquiring air force bases in Africa and Asia and ensuring pro-U.S. regimes took power across Latin America. It launched the Marshall Plan in June 1947, with which it sought to undermine Soviet hegemony throughout Eastern Europe. The U.S. also offered financial assistance to countries as part of the Marshall Plan on the condition that they opened their markets to trade, aware that the Soviets would never agree.
The Allies demanded that Stalin withdraw the Red Army from northern Iran. He initially refused, leading to an international crisis in 1946, but one year later Stalin finally relented and moved the Soviet troops out. Stalin also tried to maximise Soviet influence on the world stage, unsuccessfully pushing for Libya—recently liberated from Italian occupation—to become a Soviet protectorate. He sent Molotov as his representative to San Francisco to take part in negotiations to form the United Nations, insisting that the Soviets have a place on the Security Council. In April 1949, the Western powers established the North Atlantic Treaty Organisation (NATO), an international military alliance of capitalist countries. Within Western countries, Stalin was increasingly portrayed as the "most evil dictator alive" and compared to Hitler.

In 1948, Stalin edited and rewrote sections of Falsifiers of History, published as a series of Pravda articles in February 1948 and then in book form. Written in response to public revelations of the 1939 Soviet alliance with Germany, it focused on blaming the Western powers for the war. He also erroneously claimed that the initial German advance in the early part of the war, during Operation Barbarossa, was not a result of Soviet military weakness, but rather a deliberate Soviet strategic retreat. In 1949, celebrations took place to mark Stalin's seventieth birthday (although he was 71 at the time,) at which Stalin attended an event in the Bolshoi Theatre alongside Marxist–Leninist leaders from across Europe and Asia.

Eastern Bloc

After the war, Stalin sought to retain Soviet dominance across Eastern Europe while expanding its influence in Asia. Cautiously regarding the responses from the Western Allies, Stalin avoided immediately installing Communist Party governments across Eastern Europe, instead initially ensuring that Marxist-Leninists were placed in coalition ministries. In contrast to his approach to the Baltic states, he rejected the proposal of merging the new communist states into the Soviet Union, rather recognising them as independent nation-states.
He was faced with the problem that there were few Marxists left in Eastern Europe, with most having been killed by the Nazis. He demanded that war reparations be paid by Germany and its Axis allies Hungary, Romania, and the Slovak Republic. Aware that these countries had been pushed toward socialism through invasion rather than by proletarian revolution, Stalin referred to them not as "dictatorships of the proletariat" but as "people's democracies", suggesting that in these countries there was a pro-socialist alliance combining the proletariat, peasantry, and lower middle-class.

Churchill observed that an "Iron Curtain" had been drawn across Europe, separating the east from the west. In September 1947, a meeting of East European communist leaders was held in Szklarska Poręba, Poland, from which was formed Cominform to co-ordinate the Communist Parties across Eastern Europe and also in France and Italy. Stalin did not personally attend the meeting, sending Zhdanov in his place. Various East European communists also visited Stalin in Moscow. There, he offered advice on their ideas; for instance he cautioned against the Yugoslav idea for a Balkan federation incorporating Bulgaria and Albania. Stalin had a particularly strained relationship with Yugoslav leader Josip Broz Tito due to the latter's continued calls for Balkan federation and for Soviet aid for the communist forces in the ongoing Greek Civil War. In March 1948, Stalin launched an anti-Tito campaign, accusing the Yugoslav communists of adventurism and deviating from Marxist–Leninist doctrine. At the second Cominform conference, held in Bucharest in June 1948, East European communist leaders all denounced Tito's government, accusing them of being fascists and agents of Western capitalism. Stalin ordered several assassination attempts on Tito's life and contemplated invading Yugoslavia.

Stalin suggested that a unified, but demilitarised, German state be established, hoping that it would either come under Soviet influence or remain neutral. When the U.S. and UK remained opposed to this, Stalin sought to force their hand by blockading Berlin in June 1948. He gambled that the Western powers would not risk war, but they airlifted supplies into West Berlin until May 1949, when Stalin relented and ended the blockade. In September 1949 the Western powers transformed Western Germany into an independent Federal Republic of Germany; in response the Soviets formed East Germany into the German Democratic Republic in October. In accordance with their earlier agreements, the Western powers expected Poland to become an independent state with free democratic elections. In Poland, the Soviets merged various socialist parties into the Polish United Workers' Party (PZPR), and vote rigging was used to ensure that the PZPR secured office. The 1947 Hungarian elections were also rigged by Stalin, with the Hungarian Working People's Party taking control. In Czechoslovakia, where the communists did have a level of popular support, they were elected the largest party in 1946. Monarchy was abolished in Bulgaria and Romania. Across Eastern Europe, the Soviet model was enforced, with a termination of political pluralism, agricultural collectivisation, and investment in heavy industry. It was aimed at establishing economic autarky within the Eastern Bloc.

Asia

In October 1949, Chinese Communist leader Mao Zedong took power in China. With this accomplished, Marxist governments now controlled a third of the world's land mass. Privately, Stalin revealed that he had underestimated the Chinese Communists and their ability to win the civil war, instead encouraging them to make another peace with the KMT. In December 1949, Mao visited Stalin. Initially Stalin refused to repeal the Sino-Soviet Treaty of 1945, which significantly benefited the Soviet Union over China, although in January 1950 he relented and agreed to sign a new treaty between the two countries. Stalin was concerned that Mao might follow Tito's example by pursuing a course independent of Soviet influence, and made it known that if displeased he would withdraw assistance from China; the Chinese desperately needed said assistance after decades of civil war.

At the end of the Second World War, the Soviet Union and the United States divided up the Korean Peninsula, formerly a Japanese colonial possession, along the 38th parallel, setting up a communist government in the north and a pro-Western, anti-communist government in the south. North Korean leader Kim Il-sung visited Stalin in March 1949 and again in March 1950; he wanted to invade the south and although Stalin was initially reluctant to provide support, he eventually agreed by May 1950. The North Korean Army launched the Korean War by invading South Korea in June 1950, making swift gains and capturing Seoul. Both Stalin and Mao believed that a swift victory would ensue. The U.S. went to the UN Security Council—which the Soviets were boycotting over its refusal to recognise Mao's government—and secured international military support for the South Koreans. U.S. led forces pushed the North Koreans back. Stalin wanted to avoid direct Soviet conflict with the U.S., convincing the Chinese to aid the North.

The Soviet Union was one of the first nations to extend diplomatic recognition to the newly created state of Israel in 1948, in hopes of obtaining an ally in the Middle East. When the Israeli ambassador Golda Meir arrived in the USSR, Stalin was angered by the Jewish crowds who gathered to greet her. He was further angered by Israel's growing alliance with the U.S. After Stalin fell out with Israel, he launched an anti-Jewish campaign within the Soviet Union and the Eastern Bloc. In November 1948, he abolished the JAC, and show trials took place for some of its members. The Soviet press engaged in vituperative attacks on Zionism, Jewish culture, and "rootless cosmopolitanism", with growing levels of anti-Semitism being expressed across Soviet society. Stalin's increasing tolerance of anti-Semitism may have stemmed from his increasing Russian nationalism or from the recognition that anti-Semitism had proved a useful mobilising tool for Hitler and that he could do the same; he may have increasingly viewed the Jewish people as a "counter-revolutionary" nation whose members were loyal to the U.S. There were rumours, although they have never been substantiated, that Stalin was planning on deporting all Soviet Jews to the Jewish Autonomous Region in Birobidzhan, eastern Siberia.

1950–1953: Final years 
In his later years, Stalin was in poor health. He took increasingly long holidays; in 1950 and again in 1951 he spent almost five months on holiday at his Abkhazian dacha. Stalin nevertheless mistrusted his doctors; in January 1952 he had one imprisoned after they suggested that he should retire to improve his health. In September 1952, several Kremlin doctors were arrested for allegedly plotting to kill senior politicians in what came to be known as the Doctors' Plot; the majority of the accused were Jewish. He instructed the arrested doctors to be tortured to ensure confession. In November, the Slánský trial took place in Czechoslovakia as 13 senior Communist Party figures, 11 of them Jewish, were accused and convicted of being part of a vast Zionist-American conspiracy to subvert Eastern Bloc governments. That same month, a much publicised trial of accused Jewish industrial wreckers took place in Ukraine. In 1951, he initiated the Mingrelian affair, a purge of the Georgian branch of the Communist Party which resulted in over 11,000 deportations.

From 1946 until his death, Stalin only gave three public speeches, two of which lasted only a few minutes. The amount of written material that he produced also declined. In 1950, Stalin issued the article "Marxism and Problems of Linguistics", which reflected his interest in questions of Russian nationhood.
In 1952, Stalin's last book, Economic Problems of Socialism in the USSR, was published. It sought to provide a guide to leading the country after his death. In October 1952, Stalin gave an hour and a half speech at the Central Committee plenum. There, he emphasised what he regarded as leadership qualities necessary in the future and highlighted the weaknesses of various potential successors, particularly Molotov and Mikoyan. In 1952, he also eliminated the Politburo and replaced it with a larger version which he called the Presidium.

Death, funeral and aftermath

On 1 March 1953, Stalin's staff found him semi-conscious on the bedroom floor of his Kuntsevo Dacha. He had suffered a cerebral haemorrhage. He was moved onto a couch and remained there for three days. He was hand-fed using a spoon, given various medicines and injections, and leeches were applied to him. Svetlana and Vasily were called to the dacha on 2 March; the latter was drunk and angrily shouted at the doctors, as a result of which he was sent home. Stalin died on 5 March 1953. According to Svetlana, it had been "a difficult and terrible death". An autopsy revealed that he had died of a cerebral haemorrhage and also that his cerebral arteries were severely damaged by atherosclerosis. It has been conjectured that Stalin was murdered; Beria has been suspected of murdering him, but no firm evidence has ever appeared. According to a report published in The New York Times, Stalin was poisoned with warfarin by his own Politburo members.

Stalin's death was announced on 6 March. His body was embalmed, and then placed on display in Moscow's House of Unions for three days. The crowds of people coming to view the body were so large and disorganized that about 100 people were killed in the crush. At the funeral on 9 March, Stalin’s body was laid to rest in Lenin's Mausoleum in Red Square; hundreds of thousands attended. That month featured a surge in arrests for "anti-Soviet agitation," as those celebrating Stalin's death came to police attention. The Chinese government instituted a period of official mourning for Stalin's death. A memorial service in his honour was also held at St George the Martyr, Holborn in London.

Stalin left neither a designated successor nor a framework within which a peaceful transfer of power could take place. The Central Committee met on the day of his death, after which Malenkov, Beria, and Khrushchev emerged as the party's dominant figures. The system of collective leadership was restored, and measures introduced to prevent any one member from attaining autocratic domination. The collective leadership included the following eight senior members of the Presidium of the Central Committee of the Communist Party of the Soviet Union, listed according to the order of precedence presented formally on 5 March 1953: Georgy Malenkov, Lavrentiy Beria, Vyacheslav Molotov, Kliment Voroshilov, Nikita Khrushchev, Nikolai Bulganin, Lazar Kaganovich and Anastas Mikoyan. Reforms to the Soviet system were immediately implemented. Economic reform scaled back the mass construction projects, placed a new emphasis on house building, and eased the levels of taxation on the peasantry to stimulate production. The new leaders sought rapprochement with Yugoslavia and a less hostile relationship with the U.S., pursuing a negotiated end to the Korean War in July 1953. The doctors who had been imprisoned were released and the anti-Semitic purges ceased. A mass amnesty for certain categories of convicts was issued, halving the country's inmate population, while the state security and Gulag systems were reformed, with torture being banned in April 1953.

Political ideology

Stalin claimed to have embraced Marxism at the age of fifteen, and it served as the guiding philosophy throughout his adult life; according to Kotkin, Stalin held "zealous Marxist convictions", while Montefiore suggested that Marxism held a "quasi-religious" value for Stalin. Although he never became a Georgian nationalist, during his early life elements from Georgian nationalist thought blended with Marxism in his outlook. The historian Alfred J. Rieber noted that he had been raised in "a society where rebellion was deeply rooted in folklore and popular rituals". Stalin believed in the need to adapt Marxism to changing circumstances; in 1917, he declared that "there is dogmatic Marxism and there is creative Marxism. I stand on the ground of the latter". Volkogonov believed that Stalin's Marxism was shaped by his "dogmatic turn of mind", suggesting that this had been instilled in the Soviet leader during his education in religious institutions. According to scholar Robert Service, Stalin's "few innovations in ideology were crude, dubious developments of Marxism". Some of these derived from political expediency rather than any sincere intellectual commitment; Stalin would often turn to ideology post hoc to justify his decisions. Stalin referred to himself as a praktik, meaning that he was more of a practical revolutionary than a theoretician.

As a Marxist and an anti-capitalist, Stalin believed in an inevitable "class war" between the world's proletariat and bourgeoisie. He believed that the working classes would prove successful in this struggle and would establish a dictatorship of the proletariat, regarding the Soviet Union as an example of such a state. He also believed that this proletarian state would need to introduce repressive measures against foreign and domestic "enemies" to ensure the full crushing of the propertied classes, and thus the class war would intensify with the advance of socialism. As a propaganda tool, the shaming of "enemies" explained all inadequate economic and political outcomes, the hardships endured by the populace, and military failures. The new state would then be able to ensure that all citizens had access to work, food, shelter, healthcare, and education, with the wastefulness of capitalism eliminated by a new, standardised economic system. According to Sandle, Stalin was "committed to the creation of a society that was industrialised, collectivised, centrally planned and technologically advanced."

Stalin adhered to the Leninist variant of Marxism. In his book, Foundations of Leninism, he stated that "Leninism is the Marxism of the epoch of imperialism and of the proletarian revolution". He claimed to be a loyal Leninist, although was—according to Service—"not a blindly obedient Leninist". Stalin respected Lenin, but not uncritically, and spoke out when he believed that Lenin was wrong. During the period of his revolutionary activity, Stalin regarded some of Lenin's views and actions as being the self-indulgent activities of a spoiled émigré, deeming them counterproductive for those Bolshevik activists based within the Russian Empire itself. After the October Revolution, they continued to have differences. Whereas Lenin believed that all countries across Europe and Asia would readily unite as a single state following proletariat revolution, Stalin argued that national pride would prevent this, and that different socialist states would have to be formed; in his view, a country like Germany would not readily submit to being part of a Russian-dominated federal state. Stalin biographer Oleg Khlevniuk nevertheless believed that the pair developed a "strong bond" over the years, while Kotkin suggested that Stalin's friendship with Lenin was "the single most important relationship in Stalin's life". After Lenin's death, Stalin relied heavily on Lenin's writings—far more so than those of Marx and Engels—to guide him in the affairs of state. Stalin adopted the Leninist view on the need for a revolutionary vanguard who could lead the proletariat rather than being led by them. Leading this vanguard, he believed that the Soviet peoples needed a strong, central figure—akin to a Tsar—whom they could rally around. In his words, "the people need a Tsar, whom they can worship and for whom they can live and work". He read about, and admired, two Tsars in particular: Ivan the Terrible and Peter the Great. In the personality cult constructed around him, he was known as the vozhd, an equivalent to the Italian duce and German führer.

Stalinism was a development of Leninism, and while Stalin avoided using the term "Marxism-Leninism-Stalinism", he allowed others to do so. Following Lenin's death, Stalin contributed to the theoretical debates within the Communist Party, namely by developing the idea of "Socialism in One Country". This concept was intricately linked to factional struggles within the party, particularly against Trotsky. He first developed the idea in December 1924 and elaborated upon in his writings of 1925–26. Stalin's doctrine held that socialism could be completed in Russia but that its final victory there could not be guaranteed because of the threat from capitalist intervention. For this reason, he retained the Leninist view that world revolution was still a necessity to ensure the ultimate victory of socialism. Although retaining the Marxist belief that the state would wither away as socialism transformed into pure communism, he believed that the Soviet state would remain until the final defeat of international capitalism. This concept synthesised Marxist and Leninist ideas with nationalist ideals, and served to discredit Trotsky—who promoted the idea of "permanent revolution"—by presenting the latter as a defeatist with little faith in Russian workers' abilities to construct socialism.

Stalin viewed nations as contingent entities which were formed by capitalism and could merge into others. Ultimately he believed that all nations would merge into a single, global human community, and regarded all nations as inherently equal. In his work, he stated that "the right of secession" should be offered to the ethnic-minorities of the Russian Empire, but that they should not be encouraged to take that option. He was of the view that if they became fully autonomous, then they would end up being controlled by the most reactionary elements of their community; as an example he cited the largely illiterate Tatars, whom he claimed would end up dominated by their mullahs. Stalin argued that the Jews possessed a "national character" but were not a "nation" and were thus unassimilable. He argued that Jewish nationalism, particularly Zionism, was hostile to socialism. According to Khlevniuk, Stalin reconciled Marxism with great-power imperialism and therefore expansion of the empire makes him a worthy to the Russian tsars. Service argued that Stalin's Marxism was imbued with a great deal of Russian nationalism. According to Montefiore, Stalin's embrace of the Russian nation was pragmatic, as the Russians were the core of the population of the USSR; it was not a rejection of his Georgian origins. Stalin's push for Soviet westward expansion into eastern Europe resulted in accusations of Russian imperialism.

Personal life and characteristics
Ethnically Georgian, Stalin grew up speaking the Georgian language, and did not begin learning Russian until the age of eight or nine. It has been argued that his ancestry was Ossetian, because his genetic haplotype (G2a-Z6653) is considered typical of the Ossetians, but he never acknowledged an Ossetian identity. He remained proud of his Georgian identity, and throughout his life retained a heavy Georgian accent when speaking Russian. According to Montefiore, despite Stalin's affinity for Russia and Russians, he remained profoundly Georgian in his lifestyle and personality. Some of Stalin's colleagues described him as "Asiatic", and he supposedly once told a Japanese journalist that "I am not a European man, but an Asian, a Russified Georgian". Service also noted that Stalin "would never be Russian", could not credibly pass as one, and never tried to pretend that he was. Montefiore was of the view that "after 1917, [Stalin] became quadri-national: Georgian by nationality, Russian by loyalty, internationalist by ideology, Soviet by citizenship."

Stalin had a soft voice, and when speaking Russian did so slowly, carefully choosing his phrasing. In private he often used coarse language and profanity, although avoided doing so in public. Described as a poor orator, according to Volkogonov, Stalin's speaking style was "simple and clear, without flights of fancy, catchy phrases or platform histrionics". He rarely spoke before large audiences, and preferred to express himself in written form. His writing style was similar, being characterised by its simplicity, clarity, and conciseness. Throughout his life, he used various nicknames and pseudonyms, including "Koba", "Soselo", and "Ivanov", adopting "Stalin" in 1912; it was based on the Russian word for "steel" and has often been translated as "Man of Steel".

In adulthood, Stalin measured . His mustached face was pock-marked from smallpox during childhood; this was airbrushed from published photographs. He was born with a webbed left foot, and his left arm had been permanently injured in childhood which left it shorter than his right and lacking in flexibility, which was probably the result of being hit, at the age of 12, by a horse-drawn carriage.

During his youth, Stalin cultivated a scruffy appearance in rejection of middle-class aesthetic values. By 1907, he grew his hair long and often wore a beard; for clothing, he often wore a traditional Georgian chokha or a red satin shirt with a grey coat and black fedora. From mid-1918 until his death he favoured military-style clothing, in particular long black boots, light-coloured collarless tunics, and a gun. He was a lifelong smoker, who smoked both a pipe and cigarettes. He had few material demands and lived plainly, with simple and inexpensive clothing and furniture; his interest was in power rather than wealth.

As leader of the Soviet Union, Stalin typically awoke around 11am, with lunch being served between 3 and 5pm and dinner no earlier than 9pm; he then worked late into the evening. He often dined with other Politburo members and their families. As leader, he rarely left Moscow unless to go to one of his dachas for holiday; he disliked travel, and refused to travel by plane. His choice of favoured holiday house changed over the years, although he holidayed in southern parts of the USSR every year from 1925 to 1936 and again from 1945 to 1951. Along with other senior figures, he had a dacha at Zubalova, 35 km outside Moscow, although ceased using it after Nadezhda's 1932 suicide. After 1932, he favoured holidays in Abkhazia, being a friend of its leader, Nestor Lakoba. In 1934, his new Kuntsevo Dacha was built; 9 km from the Kremlin, it became his primary residence. In 1935, he began using a new dacha provided for him by Lakoba at Novy Afon; in 1936, he had the Kholodnaya Rechka dacha built on the Abkhazian coast, designed by Miron Merzhanov.

Personality

Trotsky and several other Soviet figures promoted the idea that Stalin was a mediocrity. This gained widespread acceptance outside the Soviet Union during his lifetime but was misleading. According to biographer Montefiore, "it is clear from hostile and friendly witnesses alike that Stalin was always exceptional, even from childhood". Stalin had a complex mind, great self-control, and an excellent memory. He was a hard worker, and displayed a keen desire to learn; when in power, he scrutinised many details of Soviet life, from film scripts to architectural plans and military hardware. According to Volkogonov, "Stalin's private life and working life were one and the same"; he did not take days off from political activities.

Stalin could play different roles to different audiences, and was adept at deception, often deceiving others as to his true motives and aims. Several historians have seen it as appropriate to follow Lazar Kaganovich's description of there being "several Stalins" as a means of understanding his multi-faceted personality. He was a good organiser, with a strategic mind, and judged others according to their inner strength, practicality, and cleverness. He acknowledged that he could be rude and insulting, but he rarely raised his voice in anger; as his health deteriorated in later life he became increasingly unpredictable and bad-tempered. Despite his tough-talking attitude, he could be very charming; when relaxed, he cracked jokes and mimicked others. Montefiore suggested that this charm was "the foundation of Stalin's power in the Party".

Stalin was ruthless, temperamentally cruel, and had a propensity for violence high even among the Bolsheviks. He lacked compassion, something Volkogonov suggested might have been accentuated by his many years in prison and exile, although he was capable of acts of kindness to strangers, even amid the Great Terror. He was capable of self-righteous indignation, and was resentful, and vindictive, holding on to grudges for many years. By the 1920s, he was also suspicious and conspiratorial, prone to believing that people were plotting against him and that there were vast international conspiracies behind acts of dissent. He never attended torture sessions or executions, although Service thought Stalin "derived deep satisfaction" from degrading and humiliating people and enjoyed keeping even close associates in a state of "unrelieved fear". Montefiore thought Stalin's brutality marked him out as a "natural extremist"; Service suggested he had tendencies toward a paranoid and sociopathic personality disorder. According to historian Geoffrey Roberts, Stalin wasn't a psychopath. He was instead an emotionally intelligent and feeling intellectual. Other historians linked his brutality not to any personality trait, but to his unwavering commitment to the survival of the Soviet Union and the international Marxist–Leninist cause.

Keenly interested in the arts, Stalin admired artistic talent. He protected several Soviet writers from arrest and prosecution, such as Mikhail Bulgakov, even when their work was labelled harmful to his regime. He enjoyed listening to classical music, owning around 2,700 records, and frequently attending the Bolshoi Theatre during the 1930s and 1940s. His taste in music and theatre was conservative, favouring classical drama, opera, and ballet over what he dismissed as experimental "formalism". He also favoured classical forms in the visual arts, disliking avant-garde styles like cubism and futurism. He was a voracious reader and kept a personal library of over 20,000 books. Little of this was fiction, although he could cite passages from Alexander Pushkin, Nikolay Nekrasov, and Walt Whitman by heart. Stalin's favourite subject was history, closely followed by Marxist theory and then fiction. He favoured historical studies, keeping up with debates in the study of Russian, Mesopotamian, ancient Roman, and Byzantine history. He was very interested in the reigns of Ivan the Terrible, Peter the Great and Catherine the Great. An autodidact, he claimed to read as many as 500 pages a day, with Montefiore regarding him as an intellectual. Lenin was his favourite author but he also read, and sometimes appreciated, a great deal of writing by Leon Trotsky and other arch-enemies. Like all Bolshevik leaders, Stalin believed that reading could help transform not just people's ideas and consciousness, but human nature itself. Stalin also enjoyed watching films late at night at cinemas installed in the Kremlin and his dachas. He liked the Western genre, although his favourite films were Volga Volga and Circus (both directed by Grigori Alexandrov and starring Lyubov Orlova).

Stalin was a keen and accomplished billiards player, and collected watches. He also enjoyed practical jokes; for instance, he would place a tomato on the seat of Politburo members and wait for them to sit on it. When at social events, he encouraged singing, as well as alcohol consumption; he hoped that others would drunkenly reveal their secrets to him. As an infant, Stalin displayed a love of flowers, and later in life he became a keen gardener. His Volynskoe suburb had a  park, with Stalin devoting much attention to its agricultural activities.

Stalin publicly condemned anti-Semitism, although he was repeatedly accused of it. People who knew him, such as Khrushchev, suggested he long harboured negative sentiments toward Jews, and it has been argued that anti-Semitic trends in his policies were further fuelled by Stalin's struggle against Trotsky. After Stalin's death, Khrushchev claimed that Stalin encouraged him to incite anti-Semitism in Ukraine, allegedly telling him that "the good workers at the factory should be given clubs so they can beat the hell out of those Jews." In 1946, Stalin allegedly said privately that "every Jew is a potential spy." Conquest stated that although Stalin had Jewish associates, he promoted anti-Semitism. Service cautioned that there was "no irrefutable evidence" of anti-Semitism in Stalin's published work, although his private statements and public actions were "undeniably reminiscent of crude antagonism towards Jews"; he added that throughout Stalin's lifetime, the Georgian "would be the friend, associate or leader of countless individual Jews". Additionally, according to Beria, Stalin had affairs with several Jewish women.

Relationships and family

Friendship was important to Stalin, and he used it to gain and maintain power. Kotkin observed that Stalin "generally gravitated to people like himself: parvenu intelligentsia of humble background". He gave nicknames to his favourites, for instance referring to Yezhov as "my blackberry". Stalin was sociable and enjoyed a joke. According to Montefiore, Stalin's friendships "meandered between love, admiration, and venomous jealousy". While head of the Soviet Union he remained in contact with many of his old friends in Georgia, sending them letters and gifts of money.

Stalin was no womanizer. According to Boris Bazhanov, Stalin's one-time secretary, "Women didn't interest him. His own woman [Alliluyeva] was enough for him, and he paid scant attention to her." However, Montefiore noted that in his early life Stalin "rarely seems to have been without a girlfriend." Montefiore described Stalin's favoured types as "young, malleable teenagers or buxom peasant women," who would be supportive and unchallenging toward him. According to Service, Stalin "regarded women as a resource for sexual gratification and domestic comfort." Stalin married twice and had several children.

Stalin married his first wife, Ekaterina Svanidze, in 1906. According to Montefiore, theirs was "a true love match"; Volkogonov suggested that she was "probably the one human being he had really loved". When she died, Stalin allegedly said: "This creature softened my heart of stone." They had a son, Yakov, who often frustrated and annoyed Stalin. Yakov had a daughter, Galina, before fighting for the Red Army in the Second World War. He was captured by the German Army and then committed suicide.

Stalin's second wife was Nadezhda Alliluyeva; theirs was not an easy relationship, and they often fought. They had two biological children—a son, Vasily, and a daughter, Svetlana, and adopted another son, Artyom Sergeev, in 1921. It is unclear if Stalin ever had a mistress during or after his marriage to Alliluyeva. In any event, she suspected that he was unfaithful with other women, and committed suicide in 1932. Stalin regarded Vasily as spoiled and often chastised his behaviour; as Stalin's son, Vasily nevertheless was swiftly promoted through the ranks of the Red Army and allowed a lavish lifestyle. Conversely, Stalin had an affectionate relationship with Svetlana during her childhood, and was also very fond of Artyom. In later life, he disapproved of Svetlana's various suitors and husbands, putting a strain on his relationship with her. After the Second World War, he made little time for his children and his family played a decreasingly important role in his life. After Stalin's death, Svetlana changed her surname from Stalin to Alliluyeva, and defected to the U.S.

After Nadezhda's death, Stalin became increasingly close to his sister-in-law Zhenya Alliluyeva; Montefiore believed that they were lovers. There are unproven rumours that from 1934 onward he had a relationship with his housekeeper Valentina Istomina. Montefiore also claimed that Stalin had at least two illegitimate children, although he never recognised them as being his. One of them, Konstantin Kuzakov, later taught philosophy at the Leningrad Military Mechanical Institute, but never met Stalin. The other, Alexander, was the son of Lidia Pereprygina; he was raised as the son of a peasant fisherman and the Soviet authorities made him swear never to reveal that Stalin was his biological father.

"Rosa Kaganovich" rumor
It was long rumored that Stalin married a sister of Lazar Kaganovich, "Rosa Kaganovich", that was spread by Soviet defectors, some of them are notable figures, including Trotsky, who alleged that "Stalin married the sister of Kaganovich, thereby presenting the latter with hopes for a promising future. That marriage apparently did not last long. At any rate, nothing more was heard about it afterwards." However this story, and the further story that also alternately included Kaganovich's daughter Maya, was a hoax. Lazar Kaganovich's relatives, in a protest letter about the publication of the Russian translation of a book published about Kaganovich in the US named "The Wolf of the Kremlin" by Stuart Kahan (who claimed to be grand-nephew of Kaganovich), rejected this story, and stated that the only sister of Kaganovich, Rachel and not Rosa, was death since 1926:

Legacy

The historian Robert Conquest stated that Stalin perhaps "determined the course of the twentieth century" more than any other individual. Biographers like Service and Volkogonov have considered him an outstanding and exceptional politician; Montefiore labelled Stalin as "that rare combination: both 'intellectual' and killer", a man who was "the ultimate politician" and "the most elusive and fascinating of the twentieth-century titans". According to historian Kevin McDermott, interpretations of Stalin range from "the sycophantic and adulatory to the vitriolic and condemnatory." For most Westerners and anti-communist Russians, he is viewed overwhelmingly negatively as a mass murderer; for significant numbers of Russians and Georgians, he is regarded as a great statesman and state-builder.

Stalin strengthened and stabilised the Soviet Union. Service suggested that the country might have collapsed long before 1991 without Stalin. In under three decades, Stalin transformed the Soviet Union into a major industrial world power, one which could "claim impressive achievements" in terms of urbanisation, military strength, education and Soviet pride. Under his rule, the average Soviet life expectancy grew due to improved living conditions, nutrition and medical care as mortality rates also declined. Although millions of Soviet citizens despised him, support for Stalin was nevertheless widespread throughout Soviet society. Stalin's necessity for Soviet Union's economic development has been questioned, and it has been argued that Stalin's policies from 1928 onwards may have only been a limiting factor.

Stalin's Soviet Union has been characterised as a totalitarian state, with Stalin its authoritarian leader. Various biographers have described him as a dictator, an autocrat, or accused him of practising Caesarism. He has also been labelled a "red fascist". Montefiore argued that while Stalin initially ruled as part of a Communist Party oligarchy, the Soviet government transformed from this oligarchy into a personal dictatorship in 1934, with Stalin only becoming "absolute dictator" between March and June 1937, when senior military and NKVD figures were eliminated. According to Kotkin, Stalin "built a personal dictatorship within the Bolshevik dictatorship." In both the Soviet Union and elsewhere he came to be portrayed as an "Oriental despot". Dmitri Volkogonov characterised him as "one of the most powerful figures in human history." McDermott stated that Stalin had "concentrated unprecedented political authority in his hands." Service stated that Stalin "had come closer to personal despotism than almost any monarch in history" by the late 1930s.

McDermott nevertheless cautioned against "over-simplistic stereotypes"—promoted in the fiction of writers like Aleksandr Solzhenitsyn, Vasily Grossman, and Anatoly Rybakov—that portrayed Stalin as an omnipotent and omnipresent tyrant who controlled every aspect of Soviet life through repression and totalitarianism. Service similarly warned of the portrayal of Stalin as an "unimpeded despot", noting that "powerful though he was, his powers were not limitless", and his rule depended on his willingness to conserve the Soviet structure he had inherited. Kotkin observed that Stalin's ability to remain in power relied on him having a majority in the Politburo at all times. Khlevniuk noted that at various points, particularly when Stalin was old and frail, there were "periodic manifestations" in which the party oligarchy threatened his autocratic control. Stalin denied to foreign visitors that he was a dictator, stating that those who labelled him such did not understand the Soviet governance structure.

A vast literature devoted to Stalin has been produced. During Stalin's lifetime, his approved biographies were largely hagiographic in content. Stalin ensured that these works gave very little attention to his early life, particularly because he did not wish to emphasise his Georgian origins in a state numerically dominated by Russians. Since his death many more biographies have been written, although until the 1980s these relied largely on the same sources of information. Under Mikhail Gorbachev's Soviet administration various previously classified files on Stalin's life were made available to historians, at which point Stalin became "one of the most urgent and vital issues on the public agenda" in the Soviet Union. After the dissolution of the Union in 1991, the rest of the archives were opened to historians, resulting in much new information about Stalin coming to light, and producing a flood of new research.

Leninists remain divided in their views on Stalin; some view him as Lenin's authentic successor, while others believe he betrayed Lenin's ideas by deviating from them. The socio-economic nature of Stalin's Soviet Union has also been much debated, varyingly being labelled a form of state socialism, state capitalism, bureaucratic collectivism, or a totally unique mode of production. Socialist writers like Volkogonov have acknowledged that Stalin's actions damaged "the enormous appeal of socialism generated by the October Revolution".

Death toll

With a high number of excess deaths occurring under his rule, Stalin has been labelled "one of the most notorious figures in history." These deaths occurred as a result of collectivisation, famine, terror campaigns, disease, war and mortality rates in the Gulag. As the majority of excess deaths under Stalin were not direct killings, the exact number of victims of Stalinism is difficult to calculate due to lack of consensus among scholars on which deaths can be attributed to the regime. Stalin has also been accused of genocide in the cases of forced population transfer of ethnic minorities in the Soviet Union and the famine in Ukraine.

Official records reveal 799,455 documented executions in the Soviet Union between 1921 and 1953; 681,692 of these were carried out between 1937 and 1938, the years of the Great Purge. According to Michael Ellman, the best modern estimate for the number of repression deaths during the Great Purge is 950,000–1.2 million, which includes executions, deaths in detention, or soon after their release. In addition, while archival data shows that 1,053,829 perished in the Gulag from 1934 to 1953, the current historical consensus is that of the 18 million people who passed through the Gulag system from 1930 to 1953, between 1.5 and 1.7 million died as a result of their incarceration. Historian and archival researcher Stephen G. Wheatcroft and Michael Ellman attribute roughly 3 million deaths to the Stalinist regime, including executions and deaths from criminal negligence. Wheatcroft and historian R. W. Davies estimate famine deaths at 5.5–6.5 million while scholar Steven Rosefielde gives a number of 8.7 million.

In 2011, historian Timothy D. Snyder summarised modern data made after the opening of the Soviet archives in the 1990s and states that Stalin's regime was responsible for 9 million deaths, with 6 million of these being deliberate killings. He further states the estimate is far lower than the estimates of 20 million or above which were made before access to the archives.

In the Soviet Union and its successor states
Shortly after his death, the Soviet Union went through a period of de-Stalinization. Malenkov denounced the Stalin personality cult, which was subsequently criticised in Pravda. In 1956, Khrushchev gave his "Secret Speech", titled "On the Cult of Personality and Its Consequences", to a closed session of the Party's 20th Congress. There, Khrushchev denounced Stalin for both his mass repression and his personality cult. He repeated these denunciations at the 22nd Party Congress in October 1962. In October 1961, Stalin's body was removed from the mausoleum and buried in the Kremlin Wall Necropolis, the location marked by a bust. Stalingrad was renamed Volgograd.

Khrushchev's de-Stalinisation process in Soviet society ended when he was replaced as leader by Leonid Brezhnev in 1964; the latter introduced a level of re-Stalinisation within the Soviet Union. In 1969 and again in 1979, plans were proposed for a full rehabilitation of Stalin's legacy but on both occasions were defeated by critics within the Soviet and international Marxist–Leninist movement. Gorbachev saw the total denunciation of Stalin as necessary for the regeneration of Soviet society. After the fall of the Soviet Union in 1991, the first President of the new Russian Federation, Boris Yeltsin, continued Gorbachev's denunciation of Stalin but added to it a denunciation of Lenin. His successor Vladimir Putin did not seek to rehabilitate Stalin but emphasised the celebration of Soviet achievements under Stalin's leadership rather than the Stalinist repressions. In October 2017, Putin opened the Wall of Grief memorial in Moscow, noting that the "terrible past" would neither be "justified by anything" nor "erased from the national memory." In a 2017 interview, Putin added that while "we should not forget the horrors of Stalinism", the excessive demonization of "Stalin is a means to attack [the] Soviet Union and Russia". In recent years, the government and general public of Russia has been accused of rehabilitating Stalin.

Amid the social and economic turmoil of the post-Soviet period, many Russians viewed Stalin as having overseen an era of order, predictability, and pride. He remains a revered figure among many Russian nationalists, who feel nostalgic about the Soviet victory over Nazi Germany in World War II, and he is regularly invoked approvingly within both Russia's far-left and far-right.

Polling by the Levada Center suggest Stalin's popularity has grown since 2015, with 46% of Russians expressing a favourable view of him in 2017 and 51% in 2019. The Center, in 2019, reports that around 70% of Russians believe that Stalin played a positive role in their homeland. A 2021 survey by the Center showed that Joseph Stalin was named by 39% of Russians as the "most outstanding figure of all times and nations" and while nobody received an absolute majority, Stalin was very clearly in first place, followed by Vladimir Lenin with 30% and Alexander Pushkin with 23%. At the same time, there was a growth in pro-Stalinist literature in Russia, much relying upon the misrepresentation or fabrication of source material. In this literature, Stalin's repressions are regarded either as a necessary measure to defeat "enemies of the people" or the result of lower-level officials acting without Stalin's knowledge.

The only part of the former Soviet Union where admiration for Stalin has remained consistently widespread is Georgia, although Georgian attitudes have been very divided. A number of Georgians resent criticism of Stalin, the most famous figure from their nation's modern history. A 2013 survey by Tbilisi State University found 45% of Georgians expressing "a positive attitude" to him. A 2017 Pew Research survey had 57% of Georgians saying he played a positive role in history, compared to 18% of those expressing the same for Mikhail Gorbachev.

Some positive sentiment can also be found elsewhere in the former Soviet Union. A 2012 survey commissioned by the Carnegie Endowment found 38% of Armenians concurring that their country "will always have need of a leader like Stalin." In early 2010, a new monument to Stalin was erected in Zaporizhzhia, Ukraine. In December 2010, unknown persons decapitated it and it was destroyed in a bomb attack in 2011. In a 2016 Kyiv International Institute of Sociology poll, 38% of respondents had a negative attitude to Stalin, 26% a neutral one and 17% a positive, with 19% refusing to answer.

Religion 
Yevstafy Zhakov, a pastor of St. Olga Strelna near St. Petersburg, caused an uproar after he hung a portrait of Stalin among sacred images, stating: "I remember him [Stalin] on appropriate occasions, the day of his birthday, his death and that of Victory. He was a true believer". Some weeks after the controversy, the Patriarchate of Moscow forced Zhakov to remove the icon of Stalin from his parish. Despite calls of "some Russians" to "beatify" Stalin, the Russian Orthodox Church has stood its ground in refusing to do so. There have also been requests by communist officials to canonize Stalin as an official saint, although these requests were never implemented – the author referencing the church's suffering under Stalin's rule. Nonetheless, some churches have kept religious icons showing Stalin at least since 2008.

See also
 Anti-Stalinist left
 Bibliography of Stalinism and the Soviet Union
 De-stalinization
 European interwar dictatorships
 Everyday Stalinism: Ordinary Life in Extraordinary Times: Soviet Russia in the 1930s
 Foreign relations of the Soviet Union
 Index of Soviet Union-related articles
 List of places named after Joseph Stalin
 List of statues of Joseph Stalin
 List of awards and honours bestowed upon Joseph Stalin
 Neo-Stalinism
 History of the Communist Party of the Soviet Union (Bolsheviks)
 Stalin's Peasants: Resistance and Survival in the Russian Village after Collectivization
 Stalin and the Scientists
 Stalin: Paradoxes of Power, 1878–1928
 Stalin: Waiting for Hitler, 1929–1941
 The Stalinist Legacy

Explanatory notes

References

Citations

Bibliography

Academic books and journals 

 
 
 
 
 
 
 
 
 
 
 
 
 
 
 
 
 
 
 
 
 
 
 
 
 
 
 
 
 
 
 
 
 
 
 
 
 
 
 
 
 
 
 
 
 
 
 
 
 
 
 
 
 
 
 
 
 
 
  excerpt

Magazines, newspapers and websites

Further reading

 
 
 
 
 
 
 
 
 
 
 
 
 
 
 
 
 
 
 
 
 
 
 
 
 
 
 
 
 
 
 
 
 
 
 
 
 
 
 
 
 
 
 

 Magazines, newspapers and websites

External links

 Stalin Library (with all 13 volumes of Stalin's works and "volume 14")
 Library of Congress: Revelations from the Russian Archives
 Electronic archive of Stalin's letters and presentations
 Stalin digital archive
 Joseph Stalin Newsreels // Net-Film Newsreels and Documentary Films Archive
 Stalin Biography from Spartacus Educational
 A List of Key Documentary Material on Stalin
 Stalinka: The Digital Library of Staliniana
 Electronic archive of Stalin’s letters and presentations
 A List of Key Documentary Material on Stalin
 

 
Stalinism
1878 births
1953 deaths
20th-century atheists
Anti-fascists
Anti-imperialism
Anti-Polish sentiment
Anti-Romanian sentiment
Anti-Turkic sentiment
Anti-revisionists
Antisemitism in Russia
Atheists from Georgia (country)
Bolsheviks
Burials at the Kremlin Wall Necropolis
Collars of the Order of the White Lion
Comintern people
Communism in Russia
Russian Communist poets
Russian Communist writers
Communists from Georgia (country)
First convocation members of the Verkhovna Rada of the Ukrainian Soviet Socialist Republic
Former Georgian Orthodox Christians
Generalissimos
Genocide perpetrators
Great Purge perpetrators
Heads of the Communist Party of the Soviet Union
Heads of government of the Soviet Union
Heroes of Socialist Labour
Heroes of the Soviet Union
Holodomor
Honorary Members of the USSR Academy of Sciences
Imperialism studies
Male poets from Georgia (country)
Marshals of the Soviet Union
Old Bolsheviks
People from Gori, Georgia
People from Tiflis Governorate
People of the Cold War
People of the Polish–Soviet War
People of the Russian Civil War
People of the Russian Revolution
People of World War II from Georgia (country)
Politburo of the Central Committee of the Communist Party of the Soviet Union members
Politicians from Georgia (country)
Politicide perpetrators
Recipients of the Czechoslovak War Cross
Recipients of the Order of Lenin
Recipients of the Order of the Red Banner
Recipients of the Order of Suvorov, 1st class
Recipients of the Order of Victory
Revolutionaries from Georgia (country)
Russian atheism activists
Russian communists
Russian exiles
Russian exiles to the Russian North
Russian political writers
Russian revolutionaries
Russian Social Democratic Labour Party members
Russification
Soviet Georgian generals
Soviet Ministers of Defence
Soviet people of World War II
Soviet politicians
Time Person of the Year
Unsolved deaths
World War II political leaders
Folk saints
Anti-Zionism in the Soviet Union